This is a list of aviation-related events from 2015.

Events

Deadliest crash
The deadliest crash of this year was Metrojet Flight 9268, an Airbus A321 which was destroyed by a terrorist bomb in the Sinai peninsula of Egypt on 31 October, killing all 224 people on board.

January
1 January
 Since mid-December 2014, the United States-led coalition against the Islamic State has conducted 13 airstrikes targeting the group around a base occupied by 300 American military personnel in Iraqs Al Anbar Governorate.

3 January
 Pakistani airstrikes in the Tirah valley in Pakistans Khyber Agency destroy four Islamic militant hideouts and a suicide bomber training center, killing 31 militants.

4 January
 An air-to-surface missile strike by an American unmanned aerial vehicle against a compound in the Datta Khel area of North Waziristan, Pakistan, kills seven Islamic militants and injures four others.
 The Pakistan Army claims that air and ground attacks against Islamic militants in the country have killed 1,200 militants since the Pakistani armed forces began a military campaign against them on 15 June 2014.

5 January
 An American unmanned aerial vehicle-launched air-to-ground missile strike in North Waziristan, Pakistan, kills Ubaidullah, a leader of al-Qaeda in the Indian subcontinent.

6 January
 The United States Department of Defense announces that it is investigating reports that airstrikes by the U.S.-led coalition against Islamic State targets in Iraq and Syria have inflicted casualties on civilians and has concluded that 13 of the 18 reports of civilian casualties – nine in Iraq and nine in Syria – between 8 August 2014 and 30 December 2014 are not credible. Two in late December 2014 have been deemed credible, and investigations of the remaining three are only in their opening stages.
 The United States Department of Homeland Security inspector general releases an audit which finds "little or no evidence" that the Predator B surveillance drones operated by United States Customs and Border Protection have met expectations or conducted effective surveillance operations during their nearly ten years of operation. The audit finds that the cost of operating the drones is five times higher than estimated; that the aircraft are plagued by maintenance problems and actually fly only 22 percent of the hours planned for them; and that the drones have contributed to the apprehension of fewer than two percent of people illegally crossing the border from Mexico into Arizona and only 0.1 percent of those crossing illegally from Mexico into Texas. A Customs and Border Protection official disputes the findings, claiming that the drones are more effective than depicted in the audit and that they "directly" contributed to the seizure of 50,000 pounds of marijuana worth $122,000,000 along the Mexican border in 2013. Customs and Border Protection flies nine Predator B surveillance drones from bases in Arizona, Florida, North Dakota, and Texas.
 The United States Federal Aviation Administration (FAA) issues its first permits for the use of commercial unmanned vehicles in the agricultural and real estate industries. The permits go to Advanced Aviation Solutions of Spokane, Washington, for "crop scouting," and to Douglas Trudeau of Tierra Antigua Realty in Tucson, Arizona, for enhanced aerial footage of buildings. The FAA's previous 11 permits, all issued in 2014, had gone to companies in the petroleum, film, and landfill industries.

7 January
 Divers and an unmanned underwater vehicle discover and photograph the tail section of Indonesia AirAsia Flight 8501 resting on the bottom of the Java Sea. It is the first discovery of a major piece of wreckage of the Airbus A320-216 since it disappeared from radar on 28 December 2014 during a flight from Surabaya, Indonesia, to Singapore.

8 January
 The U.S. Department of Defense announces that the United States Air Force will close its bases in England at RAF Mildenhall, RAF Alconbury, and RAF Molesworth by 2021, but also will base F-35A Lightning II fighters in the United Kingdom at England's RAF Lakenheath after the F-35A becomes operational in the U.S. Air Force in 2016.

9 January
 In response to a European Union ruling that Cyprus Airways must pay back over 65 million euros it received illegally as part of a 103-million-euro state aid package given to it in 2012 and 2013, Cypruss Minister of Finance, Harris Georgiades, and Minister of Communications and Works, Marios Demetriades, announce that the airline is no longer economically viable and will cease operations immediately and go out of business. Demetriades also announces plans to replace it with a new airline which also will use the "Cyprus Airways" name and logo.

10 January
 The first major piece of wreckage from Indonesia AirAsia Flight 8501, a piece of the Airbus A320-216's tail section, is brought to the surface from the bottom of the Java Sea.
 SpaceXs attempt at the worlds first upright landing of a recoverable rocket booster aboard a barge at sea fails when the grid fins of its Falcon 9 rockets first stage run out of hydraulic fluid just before landing and the booster breaks up upon striking the barge. The rocket had been launched from Cape Canaveral, Florida. SpaceX announces plans to make another attempt in February 2015 using a larger amount of hydraulic fluid.

12 January
 A volcanic eruption in Tonga sends ash into the sky, prompting the cancellation of all international flights to and from the country. Flights do not resume until 14 January.
 Divers retrieve the flight data recorder from Indonesia AirAsia Flight 8501s wreckage on the bottom of the Java Sea.

13 January
 Divers retrieve the cockpit voice recorder from Indonesia AirAsia Flight 8501s wreckage on the bottom of the Java Sea.

14 January
 A remotely operated vehicle from the Singapore Navy submarine support and rescue ship MS Swift Rescue locates and photographs the fuselage of Indonesia AirAsia Flight 8501 on the bottom of the Java Sea  from the area where the tail section had been found.

15 January
 An American unmanned aerial vehicle conducts an air-to-ground missile strike against a compound in Wocha Darra in South Waziristan, Pakistan, killing five Islamic militants and fatally injuring two others. On 23 April, the United States Government will disclose that the strike inadvertently killed two hostages – American Warren Weinstein and Italian Giovanni Lo Porto – held at the compound.
 An unidentified unmanned aerial vehicle flies briefly over the Elysée Palace in Paris, prompting an alarm by French security forces.

16 January
 Pro-Russian separatists of the Donetsk People's Republic in eastern Ukraine announce that they have captured the main terminal of Donetsk Sergey Prokofiev International Airport in Donetsk, Ukraine, from Ukrainian Army forces after months of fighting. The Ukrainian Army claims that it still holds part of the terminal.

18 January
 Israeli helicopters fire missiles at two ground vehicles in Quneitra Governorate in southern Syria, killing as many as ten people, including at least six Hezbollah members and an Iranian general.
 A Syrian Air Force Antonov An-26 (NATO reporting name "Curl") crashes at Abu adh Dhuhur Air Base in Syria, killing all 30 people on board. The Government of Syria says that it crashed due to fog, but the al Nusra Front claims to have shot it down.
 According to pro-Russian separatists, dozens of people die in Ukrainian airstrikes on Horlivka, Ukraine.

19 January
 Indonesia AirAsia X, an airline created as a joint venture of AirAsia X and Indonesia AirAsia to provide long-haul service from Bali's Ngurah Rai International Airport, makes its first flight, from Bali to Taipei, Taiwan.
 Two air-to-ground missiles fired by an American unmanned aerial vehicle strike a compound in the Shahi Khel area of the Shawal Valley in North Waziristan, Pakistan, killing at least four Islamic militants, including Adam Yahiye Gadahn. It is the fourth such strike of 2015.

20 January
 Jet fuel prices have been cut in nearly in half in the previous 12 months, but this has not prompted airlines to reduce their fares. Long-term contracts for fuel mean that airlines do not expect to enjoy the cheaper fuel prices until the summer of 2015. 
 An Olimp Air Antonov An-2 (NATO reporting name "Colt") carrying four employees of the Kazakhmys mining company and a crew of three crashes in Kazakhstan  from its destination, the Shatyrkul Mine. The crash kills all three crew members and three of the four passengers. 
UAVs are emerging as a new way for drug cartels to smuggle illegal drugs into the United States from Mexico.

21 January
 Authorities in Aden, Yemen, close Aden International Airport to protest attacks by Houthi militia forces on President of Yemen Abd Rabbuh Mansur Hadi and other officials of the Government of Yemen.

22 January
 President of Yemen Abd Rabbuh Mansur Hadi and his entire cabinet resign under pressure from Houthi militia, who take control of the Yemeni government. Hadi had granted the United States permission to fly unmanned aerial vehicles (UAVs) over Yemen to conduct surveillance flights against al-Qaeda in the Arabian Peninsula (AQAP) and had approved strikes by American UAVs against AQAP targets in Yemen. The Houthis are hostile to AQAP but also to the United States, calling into question whether American UAV flights over and strikes in Yemen can continue after Hadi's resignation.
 Ukrainian Army forces retreat from the new terminal at Donetsk Sergey Prokofiev International Airport in Donetsk, Ukraine, leaving it in the hands of pro-Russian separatists after months of fighting.

23 January
 SkyMall, LLC, and several affiliated companies responsible for publishing the airline catalog SkyMall, found in airliner seat pockets since 1990, file for Chapter 11 bankruptcy protection and request an auction in late March 2015 to begin the process of liquidating remaining merchandise. The increasing access to electronic means of making purchases during flights which airlines have provided to passengers has made the catalog unprofitable.

24 January
 After authorities deem bomb threats on Twitter against two airliners in flight over the United States – Delta Air Lines Flight 1156, flying from Portland, Oregon, to Atlanta, Georgia, with 180 passengers on board and Southwest Airlines Flight 2492, carrying 86 passengers from Milwaukee, Wisconsin, to Atlanta – to be credible, the North American Aerospace Defense Command scrambles fighter aircraft from McEntire Joint National Guard Base in Richland County, South Carolina, to escort them to Atlanta, with a pair of fighters escorting each airliner until it lands safely at Hartsfield-Jackson International Airport. A search after the airliners land finds no bomb on either aircraft.

25 January
 After two earlier failed launch attempts, Tom Bradley of the United States and Leonid Tiukhtyaev of Russia successfully set off in the "Two Eagles Balloon" from Saga, Japan, for a flight across the Pacific Ocean to an undetermined destination in North America, hoping to break both the distance and endurance records for the longest flight in a gas-filled balloon.
 A Cirrus Aircraft agent, Lue Morton, is ferrying a Cirrus SR22 from California to Hawaii when his plane runs out of fuel 250 miles short of Maui. The aircraft's auxiliary fuel tank experiences fuel-transferring problems and Morton deploys the Cirrus Airframe Parachute System to ditch safely into the ocean. There he is picked up by the US Coast Guard.

26 January
 A United States Government employee flying a small quadracopter unmanned aerial vehicle recreationally early in the morning in Washington, D.C., loses control of it. It crashes on the grounds of the White House, triggering a security alert.
 A U.S. Central Intelligence Agency unmanned aerial vehicle conducts an air-to-ground missile strike in Ma'rib Governorate, Yemen, against a car carrying three men suspected of being al Qaeda in the Arabian Peninsula members, killing all three of them.
 A Hellenic Air Force F-16 Fighting Falcon taking part in a North Atlantic Treaty Organization training exercise crashes on takeoff from Los Llanos Air Base in Albacete, Spain. It strikes five parked aircraft, killing its two crewmen and nine French military personnel on the ground. Twenty other people on the ground suffer injuries.
 Three bullets strike FlyDubai Flight 215, a Boeing 737-800 with 154 people on board, as it makes a late afternoon landing at Baghdad International Airport in Baghdad, Iraq.

27 January
 Of the 954 coalition airstrikes against Islamic State forces thus far, 705 have hit the Syrian city of Kobane and its environs. American aircraft have conducted the vast majority of the strikes.
 In the wake of bullets striking FlyDubai Flight 215 at Baghdad International Airport on 26 January, Air Arabia, Emirates, Etihad Airways, FlyDubai, Royal Jordanian Airlines, Middle East Airlines, and Turkish Airlines suspend service to the airport. Iraqi Airways continues to fly there.
 American Airlines reports that because of lower oil prices it expects to spend $5,000,000,000 less on jet fuel in 2015 than it did in 2014.

28 January
 Israeli aircraft strike Hezbollah targets in Lebanon during an exchange of artillery and missile fire between Hezbollah and Israel across the Israeli border with Lebanon.
 In response to two rockets fired from Syria at Israeli territory the previous day, Israeli aircraft strike Syrian Army artillery positions in the Golan Heights.
 Jordan proposes a precedent-setting prisoner swap with the Islamic State to bring home a Royal Jordanian Air Force pilot whose plane crashed in Syria on 24 December 2014.
 The United States Air Force announces that Boeing will build the next Air Force One. The aircraft is to be a Boeing 747-8 that is to become operational by 2023.

29 January
 A Chadian Air Force aircraft drops bombs in support of Chadian Army troops attacking Boko Haram forces in the village of Malumfatori in Borno State, Nigeria. Chad's attack is the first action against Boko Haram on Nigerian soil by non-Nigerian military forces.

30 January
 During a flight across the Pacific Ocean from Japan to Mexico in the "Two Eagles Balloon," Tom Bradley of the United States and Leonid Tiukhtyaev of Russia log  since their departure, unofficially – under rules set by the Fédération Aéronautique Internationale – breaking the distance record for a flight in a gas-filled balloon of  set in November 1981 by Ben Abruzzo, Larry Newman, Ron Clark, and Rocky Aoki aboard the balloon Double Eagle V.

31 January
 A Philippine Air Force SIAI Marchetti SF.260FH trainer aircraft crashes in the sea off Nasugbu, Batangas, Philippines, killing its two pilots.
 A suspected air-to-ground missile strike by an American unmanned aerial vehicle against a car in al-Saeed in Yemen's Shabwah Governorate kills three men suspected of being al-Qaeda in the Arabian Peninsula members.
 An American unmanned aerial vehicle conducts an air-to-ground missile strike against a car near Dinsoor, Somalia, killing Al-Shabaab's head of external operations, Yusef Dheeq. It is at least the third military unmanned aerial vehicle strike the United States has conducted in Somalia since September 2014.
 Two Chadian Air Force jet fighters strafe Boko Haram positions in Gamboru, Nigeria.
Their flight breaks the previous records for a gas-filled balloon for both distance – set in November 1981, when Ben Abruzzo, Larry Newman, Ron Clark, and Rock Aoki in a flight of  aboard the balloon Double Eagle V – and endurance – set in August 1978 by Abruzzo, Newman, and Maxie Anderson during a transatlantic flight in the balloon Double Eagle II that lasted 137 hours 6 minutes.

Late January
During the last week of January, the chief executive officers of American Airlines, Delta Air Lines, and United Airlines meet with United States Secretary of Transportation Anthony Foxx, United States Secretary of Commerce Penny Pritzker, and other United States Government officials to ask that the United States begin government-to-government negotiations with Qatar and the United Arab Emirates to investigate alleged government subsidies and overcapacity on routes that Emirates, Etihad Airways, and Qatar Airways fly between those countries and the United States. They propose that "open skies" agreements be amended to create what they call "fair skies" agreements that will make U.S. airlines more competitive with the three Persian Gulf airlines on long-haul international routes. JetBlue opposes the American-Delta-United coalition's initiative, claiming that it and other smaller U.S. carriers have benefited from the existing "open skies" agreements.

February
 The Fédération Aéronautique Internationale establishes the first judging criteria for official world record wingsuit formation attempts. Previous records are retired, with future record attempts to be judged according to the new criteria.

1 February
 Two Chadian military helicopters spend two hours striking Boko Haram positions in Gamboru, Nigeria.
 The Swiss Accident Investigation Board, responsible for investigating aviation accidents in Switzerland, is renamed the Swiss Transportation Safety Investigation Board.

3 February 
 The Islamic State releases a video of its personnel killing Royal Jordanian Air Force pilot Lieutenant Muath al-Kasasbeh by burning him to death while he stands in a cage. Jordan's state television claims the video had been made a month earlier. The Islamic State captured al-Kasasbeh – the only coalition pilot it has captured thus far – in Syria on 24 December 2014 when his plane crashed while he was attacking its positions.

4 February
 TransAsia Airways Flight 235, an ATR 72-600 with 58 people on board, experiences an engine flameout just after takeoff from Taipei Songshan Airport in Taipei, Taiwan. After clearing an apartment building, the aircraft rolls sharply to the left at low altitude, and its left wingtip strikes a taxicab on the Huangdong Viaduct and the viaduct's guardrail before it crashes into the Keelung River in Taipei. Among people on the plane, the crash kills at least 35, with another eight missing and all 15 survivors injured. Two people in the taxicab also suffer injuries. Dashcams in several vehicles driving on the viaduct record the crash.
 The United States Department of State reports that the United States has conducted 943 of the 1,022 airstrikes against the Islamic State in Syria since the campaign began on 8 August 2014. The other coalition partners – Australia, Bahrain, Canada, Denmark, France, Jordan, the Netherlands, Qatar, Saudi Arabia, the United Arab Emirates, and the United Kingdom – have conducted the other 79.

5 February
 In retaliation for the killing of pilot Lieutenant Muath al-Kasasbeh, the Royal Jordanian Air Force conducts Operation Muath the Martyr, involving dozens of Jordanian jets bombing Islamic State bases, training camps, and arms and munitions warehouses. The returning jets fly over al-Kasasbeh's home town, Aye, while Jordan's King Abdullah II pays a condolence visit to al-Kasasbeh's father there.
 A barrel-bomb attack by Syrian government helicopters on a market in Ghouta, Syria, kills at least 40 people.

6 February
 Jordan expands its air campaign against the Islamic State into Iraq for the first time, as the Royal Jordanian Air Force strikes targets in Mosul early in the morning.
 The Islamic State claims that American hostage Kayla Mueller has been killed, the sole casualty in a one-hour-long Royal Jordanian Air Force raid against a weapons warehouse in Raqqa, Syria, during Islamic prayers. The United States Government and Government of Jordan discount the claim, citing the unlikelihood of Islamic State personnel identifying attacking aircraft as Jordanian, of Mueller being the only casualty in the destruction of a building in which the Islamic State is holding her as a prisoner, and of the Islamic State holding her in a weapons warehouse.

7 February
 The United Arab Emirates sends a squadron of F-16 Fighting Falcon fighters to Jordan to operate from a base there and participate in airstrikes against Islamic State targets. The announcement marks a return of the United Arab Emirates Air Force to the anti-Islamic State coalition's air campaign after it had suspended participation in late December 2014 when the Islamic State captured downed Royal Jordanian Air Force pilot Muath al-Kasasbeh pending improvements it demanded in the capability of the United States armed forces to rescue coalition pilots from Islamic State-held territory.

8 February
 The chief of the Royal Jordanian Air Force, Major General Mansour al-Jabour, announces that Jordan has destroyed 56 Islamic State training centers, military barracks, warehouses, and weapons depots in daily airstrikes since 5 February, and that more airstrikes will follow. He adds that aircraft of the anti-Islamic State coalition have flown 5,500 sorties, including 2,000 reconnaissance flights, thus far in the air campaign, which began in Iraq in August 2014 and expanded to Syria in September 2014, that Jordan had taken part in 946 of them, and that 7,000 Islamic militants have been killed.
 Chilean mountaineers announce that they have discovered the wreckage of LAN Chile Flight 210, a Douglas DC-3 carrying 24 people, including eight members of the Chilean football (soccer) team Club de Deportes Green Cross, which disappeared over the Andes Mountains in Chile during a domestic flight from Osorno to Santiago on 3 April 1961.

9 February
 An American unmanned aerial vehicle conducts an air-to-ground missile strike against a car in Helmand Province, Afghanistan, killing eight people, including Abdul Rauf Aliza, the top recruiter for the Islamic State's affiliate in Afghanistan.

10 February
 United Nations peacekeepers and French military forces use helicopters to bombard the positions of the rebel Popular Front for the Renaissance of Central Africa in support of ground troops seeking to drive the rebels out of the town of Bria in the Central African Republic. The rebels withdraw from Bria, losing seven of their number killed.

11 February
 Observers report that Syrian Air Force strikes against rebel-held areas in the eastern suburbs of Damascus have killed at least 183 people in the preceding ten days. Targets have included Ghouta and markets in Douma.
 The European Space Agency's Intermediate eXperimental Vehicle, an experimental reentry vehicle often referred to as the "European space plane," makes its first flight, a 100-minute suborbital mission in which it launches from the Guiana Space Centre in Kourou, French Guiana, and lands in the Pacific Ocean around 3,000 km west of the Galápagos Islands (1,863 statute miles; 1,620 nautical miles).

13 February
 Refurbished after sitting in storage at the "boneyard" at Davis-Monthan Air Force Base in Arizona since 2008, the B-52G Stratofortress Ghost Rider flies from Davis-Monthan to Barksdale Air Force Base in Shreveport, Louisiana, and returns to active service. It is the first time that the United States Air Force has returned a B-52 that had been in long-term storage to active service.

15 February
 The French Navy aircraft carrier Charles de Gaulle (R91) arrives in the Persian Gulf to take part in Opération Chammal, the French component of the air campaign in Iraq against the Islamic State. The deployment is in response to the Charlie Hebdo shootings in Paris in January 2015. Charles de Gaulle operates under American command, the first time in history France has placed Charles de Gaulle under foreign command. Charles de Gaulle will operate in the Persian Gulf for eight weeks.
After a review period that will last into 2017, the FAA expects the rules to go into force and that more than 7,000 businesses will receive UAV permits in the United States between 2017 and 2020.
 President Barack Obama issues an executive order requiring United States Government agencies to disclose publicly where they operate UAVs and how they safeguard personal information gathered during UAV flights, as well as to publish an annual report on their UAV operations. The order also directs the United States Department of Commerce to work with private companies and UAV manufacturers to develop a voluntary code of conduct for the gathering and protection of personal information collected during commercial UAV flights.

16 February
 Egyptian Air Force F-16 Fighting Falcons strike Islamic State camps, training areas, and weapon depots in Libya after the Libyan wing of the Islamic State posts a video showing its personnel beheading about a dozen Coptic Christians on a beach in Libya; the dead are believed to be among 21 Coptic Christians – most of them believed to be Egyptians – killed in this way. The Government of Egypt announces the strikes, the first time it has publicly admitted taking military action in Libya during the second Libyan Civil War. In a coordinated strike, the Libyan Air Force hits Islamic State targets in Derna, Libya.

17 February
 A military aircraft targeting Boko Haram forces mistakenly bombs a funeral gathering in Abadam Faransa, Niger, killing 37 people and injuring 20 others. Locals blame the Nigerian Air Force for the attack, but Nigeria denies having any aircraft conducting bombing raids in the area.
 The Obama administration announces that the United States Government will allow the widespread export of armed unmanned aerial vehicles to allies of the United States. To receive U.S.-built drones, foreign governments will have to make a strong case for acquiring them, agree to a set of "proper use" principles created by the United States, promising to use the UAVs for national defense or other situations in which force is permitted by international law, must not use the UAVs "to conduct unlawful surveillance or [for] unlawful force against their domestic populations," and consent to American monitoring of their use of the UAVs.

21 February
 A Nigerian Air Force jet bombs Boko Haram positions around Baga, Nigeria, as Nigerian troops retake Baga from Boko Haram.

22 February
 The French aircraft carrier Charles de Gaulle begins launching airstrikes against Islamic State targets in Iraq.

24 February
 During the predawn darkness, French authorities spot at least five unidentified unmanned aerial vehicles flying illegally over Paris landmarks, including the Eiffel Tower, Les Invalides, the United States Embassy, the Place de la Concorde, and the Tour Montparnasse.

25 February
 Assault helicopters support an attack by Philippine troops against Abu Sayyaf forces in a day-long battle near Patikul in the province of Sulu in the Philippines.
The flights on two consecutive nights stoke fears in Paris of imminent terrorist violence. Later in the day, French police arrest three Al-Jazeera journalists for flying a UAV illegally over the Bois de Boulogne in western Paris.

March

2 March
 Strikes by Iraqi Air Force jets support the beginning of an offensive by Iraqi Army forces and Sunni and Shiite militias to retake Tikrit from the Islamic State.

3 March
 A Turkish Airlines flight (THY726) carrying 238 people overshoots a runway and crashes while trying to land in dense fog at an airport in Nepal. No one is seriously injured.

5 March
 A Syrian Arab Army airstrike in Syria's Idlib Governorate kills Nusra Front senior commander Abu Hammam al-Shami.
 Landing during a snowstorm at LaGuardia Airport in Queens, New York, Delta Air Lines Flight 1086, a McDonnell Douglas MD-88 carrying 132 people, skids off the end of Runway 13, crashes through a perimeter fence, and comes to rest on an earthen embankment along Flushing Bay. Twenty-four people on board suffer injuries.
 American film actor Harrison Ford crash-lands the vintage Ryan ST-3KR Recruit he is piloting on Penmar Golf Course in Venice, California, after it suffers engine failure shortly after takeoff from Santa Monica Municipal Airport in Santa Monica, California. He is hospitalized with non-life-threatening injuries.

8 March
 Aircraft of the U.S.-led coalition strike a Nusra Front compound in Idlib, Syria, killing at least nine Nusra Front personnel.
 An airstrike by the U.S.-led coalition against an Islamic State oil refinery outside Tell Abyad, Syria, killing 30 Islamic State personnel and refinery workers.
 United States Army General Martin Dempsey arrives by air aboard the French Navy aircraft carrier Charles de Gaulle (R91), which is operating in the Persian Gulf to take part in Opération Chammal, the French component of the air campaign in Iraq against the Islamic State, becoming the first Chairman of the Joint Chiefs of Staff to visit a French aircraft carrier. Charles de Gaulle has launched 12 to 15 sorties per day in support of Opération Chammal.
 Since the American-led coalition began airstrikes against Islamic State targets in Iraq and Syria in seven months previously, it has conducted 2,738 strikes. The United States has carried out 2,203, and the United Kingdom has conducted about 160.

9 March
André Borschberg pilots this leg of the flight.
All 10 people on board the two helicopters – the two Argentine pilots and eight French passengers – die. Among the dead are French athletes Florence Arthaud, Camille Muffat, and Alexis Vastine.

10 March
 Piloted by Bertrand Piccard, Solar Impulse 2 flies the second leg of its around-the-world flight, flying from Muscat International Airport in Oman to Sardar Vallabhbhai Patel International Airport in Ahmedabad, India.
 Flying in dense fog, a United States Army UH-60 Blackhawk helicopter carrying an Army National Guard crew of four and seven United States Marine Corps personnel crashes in Florida's Santa Rosa Sound near Okaloosa Island, killing all 11 men on board.

11 March
 The United States Government announces that it will send small, unarmed unmanned aerial vehicles to Ukraine along with other non-lethal aid to assist the Government of Ukraine in combat against pro-Russian separatists.

12 March
 The United States Department of Defense announces that the United States has conducted its fourth unmanned aerial vehicle strike in Somalia since September 2014, hitting a car near Bardera, Somalia, with an air-to-surface missile. They claim that the strike killed three al-Shabaab personnel, including al-Shabaab commander Adan Garaar.

13 March
 Operating against rebels of the Myanmar National Democratic Alliance Army in Myanmar's Kokang region, a Myanmar Air Force aircraft strays across the border into China and drops a bomb into a sugar cane field near Lincang in Yunnan, killing four people and injuring nine others. China urges Myanmar to investigate the bombing and take steps to ensure the safety of the Chinese border area.
 The Pakistan Armed Forces announce that they have tested Pakistan's first indigenous armed unmanned aerial vehicle, the NESCOM Burraq, and that it can operate in all weather and fire laser-guided air-to-surface missiles. They announce that they plan to use Burraq UAVs to attack Islamic militants in northwestern Pakistan.
 The Pakistan Armed Forces announce that their airstrikes in northwestern Pakistan near the border with Afghanistan have killed 48 Islamic militants in the past 24 hours.

14 March
 Syrian Air Force aircraft pound rebel-held areas in Douma, Syria, killing at least 20 people and injuring more than 100.

16–17 March (overnight)
 A chlorine gas attack on Sarmin, Syria, kills at least six people and sickens dozens of others. Human rights activists blame Syrian military helicopters for the attack, but the Government of Syria denies involvement and blames the attack on Syrian rebels.

17 March
 The United States Department of Defense reports that it has lost contact with an unarmed American MQ-1 Predator unmanned aerial vehicle over northwestern Syria. The Government of Syria claims that its air defense forces have shot down a "hostile U.S. surveillance plane," apparently a reference to the Predator. It is the first time Syria claims to have shot down an American aircraft of any type since the American-led coalition began airstrikes against Islamic State targets in Syria in September 2014.

18 March
 With André Borschberg at the controls, Solar Impulse 2 flies the third leg of its around-the-world flight, flying over India from Ahmedabad to Varanasi.

18–19 March (overnight)
 Iraqi Air Force C-130 Hercules aircraft drop hundreds of thousands of leaflets over Mosul, Iraq, promising residents that Iraqi military forces would liberate them from Islamic State control, urging them to collaborate against Islamic State forces, and asking them to take note of people cooperating with the Islamic State.

19 March
 Flown by Bertrand Piccard, Solar Impulse 2 flies the fourth leg of its around-the-world flight, flying from Varanasi, India, to Mandalay, Myanmar.
 A Yemeni Air Force jet operated by Houthi rebels fires air-to-ground missiles at the palace of deposed President of Yemen Abdu Rabu Mansour Hadi in Aden, Yemen. The attack injures no one but is a significant escalation in the Houthi rebellion against the Government of Yemen.
 An Argentine Beechcraft King Air crashes into a lagoon after takeoff from Capitán de Corbeta Carlos A. Curbelo International Airport in Laguna del Sauce, Uruguay, burns, and becomes partially submerged, killing all 10 people on board.

20 March
 Fighting between forces loyal to ousted President of Yemen Abed Rabbo Mansour Hadi and those loyal to former president Ali Abdullah Saleh at Aden International Airport in Aden, Yemen, kills at least six people.
 Houthi rebels conduct two more airstrikes against the palace in Aden, Yemen, housing Abed Rabbo Mansour Hadi. He is uninjured and the palace is not damaged.
 Richard White attacks Transportation Security Administration (TSA) officers at Louis Armstrong New Orleans International Airport in New Orleans, Louisiana with a can of wasp spray and a machete. He is shot by a Jefferson Parish sheriff's deputy before he can inflict serious injury on anyone, although one TSA officer suffers a minor wound when she is hit a by one of the deputy's shots intended for White. White dies of his wounds the following afternoon.

22 March
 After a Syrian government helicopter suffers a technical malfunction and makes an emergency crash-landing near Maarrat al-Nu'man in Syria's Idlib Governorate, rebel forces kill one of its crewmen and capture four others. A sixth crewmen is missing.

23 March
 Saying that a concrete anchor dropped into the sea during construction of a new air base for American military forces at Hekono, Okinawa, had damaged coral, the governor of Okinawa, Takeshi Onaga orders the Japanese Ministry of Defense to halt all work on the air base. The new base is intended to allow the relocation of American forces from Marine Corps Air Station Futenma in Ginowan, outside Naha, Okinawa.

24 March
 Germanwings Flight 9525 – an Airbus A320-200 (registration D-AIPX) flying from Barcelona-El Prat Airport in Barcelona, Spain, to Düsseldorf Airport in Düsseldorf, Germany, crashes near Prads-Haute-Bléone, Alpes-de-Haute-Provence, France. Evidence recovered from both the cockpit voice and flight data recorders suggests that the co-pilot, Andreas Lubitz, intentionally crashed the aircraft after preventing the captain from returning to the cockpit. All 150 people on board are killed.
 Four Russian military aircraft – two Tupolev Tu-22M3 (NATO reporting name "Backfire") bombers and two Sukhoi Su-27s (NATO reporting name "Flanker") fighters – fly over the Baltic Sea with their transponders turned off, prompting the North Atlantic Treaty Organization to scramble Danish Air Force and Italian Air Force fighters from Lithuania to identify them. The Swedish Air Force also scrambles fighters to intercept and identify the Russian aircraft.
 Syrian government helicopters reportedly conduct a chlorine gas attack against rebels in Binish, Syria, according to Syrian human rights activists, who also claim that 30 people are rushed to the hospital with breathing problems.

25 March
 American aircraft make their first strikes in support of the stalled Iraqi ground offensive to take Tikrit from the Islamic State. It is the first direct American involvement in the offensive.

26 March
 A force of 100 Royal Saudi Air Force jets begins strikes in Yemen targeting Houthi insurgent forces pushing from northern into southern Yemen. Saudi jets strike Houthi-controlled Sana'a International Airport in Sana'a, destroy four Yemeni Air Force jets at Dailami air base in Sana'a, pound Al Anad Air Base in Lahij Governorate, target the Houthi leader in Saada Governorate, and hit the Houthi-occupied presidential palace in Aden and Houthi bases around Aden. The strikes kill at least 23 people and wound at least 47 others. Bahrain reports that it has contributed 12 Royal Bahraini Air Force jets to the operation, and Jordan is believed to have committed Royal Jordanian Air Force aircraft to it.

27 March
 After the crash of Germanwings Flight 9525, the European Aviation Safety Agency issues a temporary recommendation for airlines to ensure that at least two crew members, including at least one pilot, are in the cockpit at all times of the flight.

28 March
 Airstrikes by the Saudi-led Arab coalition against Houthi rebels intensify across Yemen, many of them hitting Houthi air defense and command, control, and communications sites. One strike against a Houthi ammunition depot outside Aden kills or injures scores of people.

29 March
 After taking off from Mandalay, Myanmar, the previous evening, Solar Impulse 2 completes the fifth leg of its around-the-world flight, landing at Chongqing Jiangbei International Airport in Chongqing in China. Pilot Bertrand Piccard successfully lands the aircraft under challenging conditions due to high winds and heavy air traffic at the airport, and because of delays in landing Solar Impulse 2 is airborne for 20 hours 29 minutes.
 Air Canada Flight 624, an Airbus A320-211 (registration C-FTJP) with 138 people on board, lands short of the runway in snow and poor visibility at Halifax International Airport in Halifax, Nova Scotia, Canada. It smashes through an antenna array, loses its landing gear, severs the power line that supplies all of the airport's electricity, and slides to a stop on its belly, suffering severe damage. All aboard survive, but 23 people suffer injuries.

30 March
 China's People's Liberation Army Air Force (PLAAF) conducts an exercise over the Western Pacific for the first time, its aircraft flying over the Bashi Channel between Luzon and Taiwan to reach the exercise area. It is the first time that the PLAAF has exercised so far from the coast of China.
 An airstrike by the Saudi-led coalition targeting a Houthi military position set up inside the Mazraq refugee camp for displaced persons in Yemen's Hajjah Governorate is the single deadliest strike thus far in the Saudi-led coaition's air campaign in Yemen, killing at least 29 and perhaps as many as 40 people and injuring about 200 others. Other coalition airstrikes hit pro-Houthi Yemeni Republican Guard air defense positions and ammunition depots around Sana'a.
 Yemenia suspends flight operations due to military conflict at its home base, Sana'a International Airport in Sana'a, Yemen.
 Iran claims that a missile strike by an American unmanned aerial vehicle on 23 March killed two members of the Iranian Revolutionary Guard Corps serving as advisors in the Iraqi ground offensive to take Tikrit from the Islamic State. The United States denies conducting any airstrikes that could have resulted in their deaths.

31 March
 Since 1 January, Airbus has booked gross orders for 121 aircraft, while Boeing has booked 116. However, after cancellations and conversions, Boeing has 110 net orders since 1 January compared with Airbus's 101. Since 1 January, Airbus has delivered 134 aircraft to customers, including one A350 and four A380s.
 American Airlines has logged $1,200,000,000 in profits since 1 January, its most profitable quarter in history.
 Historically low prices for jet fuel have saved airlines in the United States $3,300,000,000 in fuel costs since 1 January.

April

2 April
 Syrian Air Force aircraft bomb Nusra Front forces in southern Syria after they capture the last functioning border crossing between Syria and Jordan.

3 April
 Aircraft of the Saudi-led coalition strike Houthi rebels advancing on Aden, Yemen, and airdrop weapons to the defenders of Aden. It is the first airdrop since the coalition intervened in Yemen.

4 April
 A Eurocopter AS365 Dauphin helicopter (registration 9M-IGB) crashes in Semenyih, Malaysia, and bursts into flames, killing all six people on board. Among the dead are the Prime Minister of Malaysia's chief of staff, Azlin Alias, and the Malaysian politician Jamaluddin Jarjis.

6 April
 Kenyan Air Force aircraft strike al-Shabaab positions around Gadondhawe and Dhasheeg, Somalia, destroying two of the group's camps.

7 April
 A Russian Sukhoi Su-27 (NATO reporting name "Flanker") intercepts a United States Air Force Boeing RC-135U over the Baltic Sea. Within a few days, the United States Department of Defense issues a complaint about the Russian pilot's behavior, claiming that he flew his Su-27 within  of the RC-135U.
 Lightning strikes Icelandair Flight 671, a Boeing 757, about 90 seconds after it takes off from Keflavik International Airport in Reykjavik, Iceland, for a  flight to Denver, Colorado. It punches a hole in the nose of the plane. Unaware of the damage, the pilots complete the seven-and-a-half-hour flight to Denver without further incident. No one on board is injured.
 A Cessna 414 carrying seven people crashes in McLean County, Illinois, two miles east of Central Illinois Regional Airport, killing all on board. Among the dead are Aaron Leetch, the deputy athletic director of Illinois State University, and Torrey Ward, associate coach of the Illinois State Redbirds men's basketball team. The two men had been returning to Illinois State after the NCAA Division I men's basketball tournament.

8 April
 Royal Canadian Air Force CF-18 Hornets conduct Canada's first airstrike of the U.S.-led air campaign in Iraq and Syria against the Islamic State, hitting an Islamic State garrison near Raqqa, Syria.

10 April
 A man wielding a knife attacks and slightly injures a French soldier patrolling inside Orly Airport outside Paris, France. The man escapes, prompting French authorities to launch a search for him.
 The United States Air Force grounds its entire fleet of 445 T-6A Texan II trainer aircraft because of concerns over a potential malfunction in the engines' oil line. Inspection of all aircraft for the defect will not be completed until 14 April.
 British Airways Flight 144, serviced by an Airbus A321, makes an emergency landing in Baku, Azerbaijan due to engine fire, passengers and crew are not harmed.

11 April
 Syrian government airstrikes on rebel-held areas of Aleppo and rebel artillery fire against government-controlled areas of the city combine to kill at least 30 people.

12 April
 A Syrian government airstrike near a school in a rebel-controlled neighborhood of Aleppo kills at least nine people.
 An American unmanned aerial vehicle air-to-ground missile strike in Yemen kills al-Qaeda in the Arabian Peninsula senior leader Ibrahim al-Rubaish.

13 April
 The United States Department of Justice files legal papers in federal court in Portland, Oregon, stating that passengers denied boarding on an airliner will receive a letter telling them that they are on the secret No-Fly List and providing them with the option of requesting additional information – which the United States Government will provide if sufficient unclassified information is available for an answer – as well as of submitting information with which to challenge their inclusion on the list. Previously, travelers denied boarding could appeal their denial of boarding to the United States Department of Homeland Security, but were not told whether or not they were on the No-Fly List, a procedure a federal judge had ruled unconstitutional in June 2014. About 47,000 people are on the No-Fly List; about 800 of them are Americans.
 Alaska Airlines Flight 448 – a Boeing 737-900 bound for Los Angeles International Airport in Los Angeles, California, with 170 passengers and six crew members on board – returns to Seattle-Tacoma International Airport in SeaTac, Washington, after only 14 minutes in the air after the pilot hears banging from within the aircraft. The source of the banging turns out to be a ramp agent who had fallen asleep in the aircraft's cargo hold after helping to load baggage into it. He emerges from the cargo hold unharmed after landing.

14 April
 Asiana Airlines Flight 162, an Airbus A320-200 (registration HL7762) with 82 people on board, loses height on final approach to Hiroshima Airport in Mihara, Japan, strikes an instrument landing system localizer antenna, and skids onto the runway on its tail, spinning 180 degrees before coming to a stop. Its landing gear collapses and it suffers damage to its left wing and left engine. No one is killed, but 20 of the people on board suffer injuries.
 Al-Qaeda in the Arabian Peninsula forces seize Riyan Airport outside Mukalla, Yemen, facing no resistance.
 SpaceXs second attempt at the worlds first upright landing of a recoverable rocket booster aboard a barge at sea fails when the first stage of the Falcon 9 rocket lands on the barge moored n the Atlantic Ocean "too hard for survival," according to SpaceX founder, chief executive officer, and chief designer Elon Musk. The rocket had been launched from Cape Canaveral, Florida.

15 April
 Ruskin, Florida, letter carrier Doug Hughes makes an unexpected and unauthorized flight of approximately one hour from Gettysburg Regional Airport outside Gettysburg, Pennsylvania, to the grounds of the United States Capitol Building in Washington, D.C., in a small, one-person gyrocopter bearing the logo of the United States Postal Service, claiming he made the flight to deliver a letter about campaign finance corruption to each of the 535 members of the United States Congress. United States Capitol Police arrest him at gunpoint as soon as he lands.
 An unmanned aerial vehicle links up with the fuel probe of an aerial tanker for the first time in history when the United States Navy Northrop Grumman X-47B Unmanned Combat Air System-Demonstrator (UCAS-D) Salty Dog 502 successfully connects with the fuel probe of an Omega Aerial Refueling Services Boeing KC-707 tanker over the Chesapeake Bay. The tanker does not transfer fuel to the X-47B.

18 April
 Militiamen loyal to Yemen's exiled president besiege Al-Annad air base in Yemen, supported by Royal Saudi Air Force strikes. The base, held by Houthi rebels, once had played a key role in American unmanned aerial vehicle strikes against al-Qaeda in the Arabian Peninsula.

19 April
 Syrian Air Force raids on three towns in southern Syria kill at least 16 people.
 Oxfam accuses the Saudi-led coalition conducting airstrikes in Yemen of hitting one of its facilities in Saada Governorate that was loaded with humanitarian supplies even though Oxfam had notified the coalition of the facility's location and purpose.
 The U.S. Navy aircraft carrier  departs the Persian Gulf on her way to a deployment off Yemen in response to the conflict there. The move takes her away from conducting airtstrikes against the Islamic State in Iraq and Syria.

20 April
 An airstrike conducted by the Saudi-led coalition against a weapons depot in Sana'a, Yemen, kills at least 25 people and injures over 350. It apparently is the deadliest airstrike in Sana'a since the coalition intervened in Yemen on 26 March.
 The Washington Post reports that a United States Department of Homeland Security Inspector General's report has accused United States Immigration and Customs Enforcement (ICE) of wasting up to $41 million by sending illegal immigrants home on charter flights that are often only 40 to 80 percent full and by flying detainees multiple times between the same cities without documenting reasons for moving them. It recommends using fewer, full flights, but ICE argues that it sometimes is more expensive to have charter aircraft lying idle while they await full passenger loads than it is to keep them flying with partial loads of passengers.

21 April
 After taking off from Chongqing Jiangbei International Airport in Chonqing, China, the previous evening, Solar Impulse 2, with Bertrand Piccard at the controls, completes the sixth leg of its around-the-world flight, landing at Nanjing Lukou International Airport in Nanjing, China. The flight takes place after a three-week weather-related delay in Chongqing.
 Round-the-clock airstrikes in Yemen cease as the Government of Saudi Arabia announces that it will end its air campaign against Houthi rebels in Yemen, Operation Decisive Storm, which has conducted punishing airstrikes daily since it began on 26 March. Although air raids will continue, the intervention is to begin emphasizing humanitarian relief, anti-terrorism operations, and a political solution to the conflict in Yemen in a new operation called Operation Restoring Hope.

22 April
 An unmanned aerial vehicle carrying traces of radioactive material is discovered on the roof of the residence of Prime Minister of Japan Shinzo Abe in Tokyo, Japan.
 Hours after the Saudi announcement of the end of Operation Decisive Storm, aircraft of the Saudi-led coalition resume heavy airstrikes in Yemen. Targets include Houthi rebel command sites around Taiz and Houthi and other rebel forces around Aden.
 An air-to-ground missile strike apparently carried out by an American unmanned aerial vehicle strikes a car traveling in Mukalla, Yemen, killing seven members of Al Qaeda in the Arabian Peninsula.
 Syrian government aircraft bomb rebel positions in Harasta and Douma, killing 11 people, as well as a hospital in Dayr Hafir and villages surrounding Dayr Hafir in Aleppo Governorate, killing another 15 to 23 people and wounding 40.
The flight brings the U.S. Navy's X-47 program to a successful conclusion.

23 April
 Airstrikes by the Saudi-led coalition targeting rebel forces strike six cities in Yemen.

24 April
 The U.S. Navy aircraft carrier USS Theodore Roosevelt (CVN-71) leaves waters near Yemen to return to the Persian Gulf and the air campaign in Iraq and Syria against the Islamic State.

25 April
 According to Arab media reports, Israeli Air Force aircraft conduct airstrikes near Syria's Qalamoun Mountains north of Damascus, targeting Hezbollah sites and Syrian Arab Army divisions in possession of long-range missiles. The Government of Israel does not respond to the reports.
 Turkish Airlines Flight 1878, the Airbus A320-200 Gümüşhane (registration TC-JPE), rolls to the right just before touching down at Istanbul Atatürk Airport in Istanbul, Turkey. A tail strike results, followed by a hard landing on the starboard landing gear and substantial damage to the starboard wing. The crew conducts a go-around, during which the damaged wing catches fire. Upon landing after the go-around, the starboard landing gear collapses and the aircraft spins almost 180 degrees and slides off the runway. All 102 people on board evacuate without injury via evacuation slides and the airport's fire department extinguishes the fire.

26 April
 After Israeli troops observe four men attempting to emplace a bomb in the fence between Syrian territory and the Israeli-occupied Golan Heights, an Israeli Air Force aircraft conducts an air-to-ground missile attack against the men, killing them.
 The Saudi-led coalition conducts airstrikes in Yemen against rebel forces and facilities in Sana'a, Dhamar, Ma'rib, Aden, the Shabwa Governorate, Hajjah, Saada, Ibb, and Lahij. The strikes in Sana'a hit a military base serving as an arms depot and weapons being moved near the presidential palace, while in Aden they hit rebel troops engaged in street fighting against forces loyal to ousted President of Yemen Abed Rabbo Mansour Hadi.

27 April
On 26 and 27 April combined, helicopters reportedly airlift 150 to 170 people off Mount Everest.
 According to Arab media reports, Israeli Air Force airstrikes again hit Hezbollah sites and Syrian Arab Army divisions near the Qalamoun Mountains. Israel denies the reports, blaming any attacks that did happen on the combatants in the Syrian Civil War.

28 April
 Throughout the day, Indian military helicopters airlift people injured in 25 April earthquake from remote parts of Nepal to Kathmandu for treatment at General Birendra Military Hospital.
 The arrival of international rescuers and aid workers in large numbers in Nepal combined with poor weather overwhelms the facilities at Tribhuvan International Airport in Kathmandu causing back-ups in air traffic, with up to ten aircraft at a time waiting on the tarmac at New Delhi, India, for permission to take off and proceed to Kathmandu.
 A glitch in the iPad application FliteDeck – used by American Airlines pilots to view flight plans – that causes the application to display duplicate charts for Ronald Reagan Washington National Airport in Arlington, Virginia, and stop functioning forces American to ground dozens of flights. Groundings and delays continue into 29 April before the airline resolves the problem.

May
1 May
 On the day of the announcement of Operation Jalisco – a Mexican Army operation to take back control of the state of Jalisco in western Mexico from the Jalisco New Generation Cartel narcotics-trafficking organization – gunmen shoot down a Mexican military helicopter, which makes an emergency landing. Initially, three soldiers are reported killed and 10 soldiers and two police officers injured in the incident; later reports place the death toll at six.

1–2 May (overnight)
 According to claims by the activist group Syrian Civil Defense, Syrian government helicopters conduct a chlorine gas attack against Nareb and Saraqib in Idlib Governorate, killing one child and injuring about 40 people. The Government of Syria does not respond to the claim.

2 May
 The Syrian Observatory for Human Rights claims that U.S.-led airstrikes in Syria on 30 April and 1 May killed at least 52 civilians in their homes in Bir Mahli. United States Central Command responds that it has no information with which to substantiate this claim, but would investigate it further. According to Central Command, the two days of strikes had destroyed seven Islamic State positions and one Islamic State ground vehicle near Kobanî.
 Syrian Air Force aircraft kill 13 civilians in strikes against rebel positions in Deir ez-Zor Governorate.

3 May
 Runway damage forces the Government of Nepal to close Tribhuvan International Airport in Kathmandu – Nepal's only international airport and only airport capable of handling jetliners – to large aircraft delivering aid following the 25 April earthquake. Cracks have appeared in the main runway, which was designed to handle medium-sized jetliners but not the large jets arriving in the aftermath of the earthquake.

4 May
 The United Nations requests that the Saudi-led coalition halt its air attacks in Yemen, particularly those against Sana'a International Airport in Sana'a, to allow the delivery of humanitarian aid to the country. Although the Government of Saudi Arabia announces that it is considering the request, the coalition conducts heavy airstrikes during the day against targets in Yemen, including 150 strikes against Aden International Airport in Aden and additional air attacks against Hodeida International Airport in Hodeida, Sana’a International Airport, and rebel sites and forces in Ma'rib Governorate and Sa'dah.

5 May
 Houthi rebel forces in Yemen fire artillery rockets and mortar rounds into southern Saudi Arabia, prompting the Saudi state airline, Saudia, to cancel flights into Saudi Arabia's Najran area.
 Saudi attack helicopters fire on Houthi rebels near the border between Saudi Arabia and Yemen.

7 May
 China announces that it reserves the right to establish an air defense identification zone over the South China Sea, saying that a decision to do so will depend on its assessment as to whether aviation safety there is threatened.
 The Government of Saudi Arabia offers to suspend airstrikes for five days for a "humanitarian pause" in its campaign against rebel forces in Yemen to allow aid to reach refugees in Yemen, and also suggests that the suspension could last longer if rebel forces abide by a ceasefire and do not use it to gain additional territory.

8 May
 A Pakistan Army Aviation Corps Mil Mi-17 (NATO reporting name "Hip") transport helicopter crashes in the Naltar Valley in northern Pakistan while carrying international diplomatic personnel to the opening of a chair lift at a ski resort, killing eight of the 20 people on board. Among the dead are the ambassador from Norway, Leif Holger Larsen, the ambassador from the Philippines, Domingo Lucenario, Jr., and the wives of the ambassador from Indonesia and the high commissioner from Malaysia. The ambassadors from Indonesia, the Netherlands, Poland, and Romania and the high commissioners from Malaysia and South Africa are injured.
 The Government of Saudi Arabia announces that it will treat all of Yemen's Saada Governorate as a military target and advises civilians there to evacuate by nightfall. Aircraft of the Saudi-led coalition drop leaflets over the governorate urging civilians to leave and assuring them that roads in the governorate would remain safe from attack until 19:00 local time.
 The Saudi government announces that it will begin a five-day ceasefire in its air campaign in Yemen at 23:00 local time on 12 May to allow the delivery of humanitarian aid to refugees, but adds that it will resume air attacks before the five-day period is over if Yemeni rebel forces continue their attacks.
 To commemorate the 70th anniversary of Victory in Europe Day – when Nazi Germany surrendered to the Western Allies at the end of World War II in Europe on 8 May 1945 – the Arsenal of Democracy Flyover takes place over Washington, D.C. Fifty-six aircraft of the World War II era take part; aircraft types represented are the Piper L-4 Grasshopper, Boeing PT-17 Stearman, Fairchild PT-19, North American AT-6 Texan, Beech AT-11 Kansan, Curtiss P-40 Warhawk, North American B-25 Mitchell, Consolidated PBY Catalina, Douglas SBD Dauntless, General Motors FM-2 Wildcat, Lockheed P-38 Lightning, Consolidated B-24 Liberator, North American P-51 Mustang, Boeing B-17G Flying Fortress, Douglas C-47 Skytrain, Douglas C-53 Skytrooper, Curtiss SB2C Helldiver, General Motors TBM Avenger, Douglas A-26 Invader, Vought F4U Corsair, and Boeing B-29 Superfortress. One Avenger suffers a mechanical malfunction as it passes the review area over the National World War II Memorial and makes an immediate emergency landing at nearby Ronald Reagan Washington National Airport in Arlington, Virginia.

9 May
 An Airbus A400M Atlas cargo aircraft on a test flight crashes just after takeoff from San Pablo Airport in Seville, Spain, killing four people and seriously injuring two. Germany and the United Kingdom ground their A400M aircraft pending an investigation of the crash.
 Airstrikes in Yemen by the Saudi-led coalition hit several areas in the city of Sa'dah in Saada Governorate, including the government compound and a market, as well as targets in 'Amran Governorate and Hajjah Governorate. The Government of Saudi Arabia announces that the coalition has conducted 130 airstrikes over the previous 24 hours, including attacks on hospitals and schools the Saudis claim the rebels are using as storage sites for weapons.
 The United Nations humanitarian coordinator for Yemen, Johannes van der Klaauw, asserts that Saudi Arabia's designation of all of Yemen's Saada Governorate as a military target and the Saudi-led coalition's airstrikes against the city of Sa'dah violate international humanitarian law.
 Russia celebrates the 70th anniversary of Nazi Germany's surrender to the Soviet Union on 9 May 1945 with a Victory Day Parade in Moscow that includes a flyover by 150 aircraft. Participating aircraft types are the Mil Mi-26, Mil Mi-17, Mil Mi-24, Mil Mi-28, Mil Mi-35, Kamov Ka-52, Kazan Ansat, Mikoyan MiG-29, Mikoyan MiG-31, Sukhoi Su-24, Sukhoi Su-25, Sukhoi Su-27, Sukhoi Su-30, Sukhoi Su-34, Sukhoi Su-35, Ilyushin Il-76, Ilyushin Il-78, Tupolev Tu-22M3, Tupolev Tu-95, Tupolev Tu-160, Antonov An-124 Ruslan, and Antonov An-22. Also appearing are Yakovlev Yak-130s from the new aerobatic group Crimean Wings and Sukhoi Su-27s and Mikoyan MiG-29s of the Russian Knights and Swifts aerobatics teams.

11 May
 Australia urges the China not to establish an air defense identification zone over the South China Sea, adding that such an action would raise deep concerns among the Association of Southeast Asian Nations (ASEAN).
 Aircraft of the Saudi-led coalition strike suspected rebel weapon depots on the outskirts of Sana'a, Yemen.
 Rebel antiaircraft artillery shoots down a Royal Moroccan Air Force F-16 Fighting Falcon taking part in a reconnaissance mission over a mountainous region along the border between Yemen and Saudi Arabia. It is the second coalition plane lost during operations over Yemen and the first to be shot down by rebel forces.
 An air-to-ground missile strike, presumably by American unmanned aerial vehicles, hits Islamic militants in Mukalla, Yemen, who had recently taken possession of the city's presidential residence, killing four members of al-Qaeda in the Arabian Peninsula.
 Human Rights Watch accuses the Saudi-led coalition in Yemen of blocking air and sea routes into Yemen, "keeping out fuel needed for the Yemeni population's survival, in violation of the laws of war.".

12 May
 A United States Marine Corps Bell UH-1Y Venom helicopter with six U.S. Marines and two Nepalese soldiers aboard disappears while delivering humanitarian aid to people in Nepal's Dolakha District on the day of a second major earthquake in Nepal.
 A Syrian government helicopter drops a barrel bomb onto a crowded bus depot in Aleppo, destroying buses, cars, and motorcycles and killing at least 28 and perhaps as many as 50 people.
 The Saudi-led coalition conducts airstrikes in Yemen targeting three rebel weapon depots in Sana'a, as well as three airstrikes against bases for Yemen Army units loyal to rebel forces. Coalition aircraft also hit Houthi rebel positions in Aden. At 23:00 local time, it begins a previously announced, unilateral five-day ceasefire to allow the delivery of humanitarian aid to people in Yemen.

13 May
 Although the ceasefire in Yemen begun the previous day generally holds, the Saudi-led coalition conducts an airstrike against Houthi rebels attempting to reinforce their forces in Aden.

14 May
 On the second full day of the ceasefire in Yemen, an attack helicopter belonging to the Saudi-led coalition attacks a truck in northern Yemen, killing nine people.
 The U.S. Government Accountability Office reports that the United States Air Force and United States Army provide insufficient training to their unmanned aerial vehicle (UAV) pilots and have too few pilots for the number of UAV missions flown, forcing some pilots to skip training in order to operate UAVs on actual missions. It also reports that only 35 percent of U.S. Air Force UAV pilots complete all of their training, that Air Force UAV training squadrons at Holloman Air Force Base, New Mexico, are manned at just 63 percent of authorized levels, that Air Force UAV pilots are trained mostly in surveillance and reconnaissance without receiving training in other mission areas such as interdiction, that most U.S. Army UAV pilots do not complete their training because they are assigned to other duties too often, that the Army does not have a method of keeping track of the training records of its UAV pilots, and that some UAV instructors themselves lack sufficient UAV training.

15 May
 Seventeen-year-old Canadian Raymond Wang wins first prize in the 2015 Intel International Science and Engineering Fair for designing a system of fin-like devices that can be installed in the air inlets of a Boeing 737 to reduce disease transmission aboard airliners by creating a virtual "wall of air" around each passenger. Wang estimates the modification, which can be installed overnight at a cost of $1,000 (USD) per aircraft, can reduce the concentration of airborne pathogens by 55 times and increase the availability of fresh air to passengers by 190 percent.

16 May
 Black Hawk helicopters and MV-22 Ospreys insert U.S. Delta Force personnel into Syria at Al-Amr, near Deir al-Zour, for an early morning ground raid, immediately coming under fire from Islamic State forces. The Delta Force troops kill about a dozen Islamic State personnel including senior commander Abu Sayyaf, capture his wife, and seize laptop computers, cell phones, and archaeological and historic items without suffering any casualties, after which the aircraft successfully extract them.
 A U.S. unmanned aerial vehicle-launched air-to-ground missile strike in North Waziristan, Pakistan, against a Tehrik-i-Taliban Pakistan compound kills five Islamic militants.
 Two Turkish Air Force F-16 Fighting Falcons shoot down a Syrian aircraft that violates Turkey's airspace. The Government of Turkey claims the aircraft was a helicopter, while the Government of Syria asserts that it was an unmanned aerial vehicle.

17 May
 A U.S. Marine Corps MV-22 Osprey carrying 21 U.S. Marines and one United States Navy hospital corpsman crashes on landing at Bellows Air Force Station in Waimanalo, Hawaii, and catches fire, killing one Marine and injuring the other 21 people aboard, all of whom are sent to hospitals.

18 May
 The Saudi-led coalition resumes airstrikes in Yemen early in the morning – targeting rebel positions and tanks in Aden – after the expiration at 23:00 local time on 17 May of the coalition's unilateral five-day ceasefire to allow the delivery of humanitarian aid to people in Yemen. Strikes later in the day hit additional targets in Aden, including Aden International Airport, and in Saada Governorate.

20 May
 People's Liberation Army Navy radio operators challenge a United States Navy P-8A Poseidon patrol aircraft eight times as it flies over the South China Sea with a team of CNN journalists aboard, ordering it to leave what China claims to be its territorial waters, a claim which includes most of the South China Sea. The P-8A's crew replies each time that they are flying over international waters and continue their flight. The Chinese challenges increase concerns that tensions between China and the United States over freedom of navigation in the South China Sea will lead to a violent confrontation.

21 May
 United States Central Command announces the results of its four-month investigation into allegations that airstrikes in Syria and Iraq against the Islamic State by the U.S.-led coalition have killed civilians, reporting that the strikes have killed at least two civilians since they began in 2014. The two dead civilians were two children probably killed during strikes against Harem, Syria, on 5 and 6 November 2014. It also reports that it continues to investigate the killing of one other civilian in Syria and two civilians in Iraq.
 The U.S.-led coalition has conducted 2,458 airstrikes in Iraq and 1,593 strikes in Syria since August 2014, mostly against Islamic State targets.

22 May
 Air Lituanica ceases flight operations. It will file for bankruptcy on 8 June.

24 May
 A Syrian military helicopter crashes while taking off from an airbase at Kweiras in Aleppo Governorate, killing its entire crew. Syrian government television claims it crashed due to technical problems, but the Syrian Observatory for Human Rights asserts that Islamic State forces shot it down.
 On American television, United States Senator John McCain says that 75 percent of U.S. air combat missions against the Islamic State over Iraq and Syria return to base without firing their weapons or dropping any bombs because of a lack of U.S. special operations forces on the ground to provide targeting information.

25 May
 Anonymous phone threats, perhaps from the same source, prompt searches of six international flights in the United States: United States Air Force fighter aircraft escort Air France Flight 22 – an Airbus A330-200 – to John F. Kennedy International Airport in Queens, New York, after someone says a chemical weapon is aboard; an American Airlines flight arriving there from Birmingham, England, and a Saudi Arabian Airlines flight arriving there also receive threats; a United Airlines jet arriving from Madrid is evacuated at Newark Liberty International Airport in Newark, New Jersey; and two Delta Air Lines airliners, one flying from Paris to Boston and the other from London to Newark, receive threats. Searches of the six aircraft find no threats.

27 May
 An airstrike by the Saudi-led coalition strikes a headquarters for police commandos in Sana'a, Yemen, where hundreds of people have gathered to prepare to fight on the rebel side against forces loyal to Yemen's ousted president, killing at least 45 people and wounding at least 286.

28 May
 Eastern Airlines begins flight operations, flying charter flights from Miami International Airport in Miami, to José Martí International Airport in Havana. A new airline, it uses the trademarks of the original Eastern Air Lines, which had gone out of business in 1991 in aviation#1991; the new Eastern's ownership group had purchased the intellectual property, including trademarks, of the original Eastern in 2009.

30 May
 After a 39-day stay at Nanjing, Solar Impulse 2 departs Nanjing Lukou International Airport with André Borschberg at the controls for the seventh leg of its attempt to become the first solar-powered aircraft to fly around the world, a planned 144-hour non-stop flight to Honolulu, covering .
 Syrian government airstrikes in northern Syria kill at least 85 people. In the deadliest of the strikes, Syrian government helicopters drop two barrel bombs on a farmers market in Islamic State-held al-Bab early in the morning just as farmers and customers are arriving at the market, killing at least 50 people and injuring at least 20. Later in the morning, a raid on Aleppo kills 12 people, and another raid on the Zawiya Mountain area kills 14.

June

1 June
 Deteriorating weather along its route forces Solar Impulse 2 to cut short its planned 144-hour non-stop flight from Nanjing Lukou International Airport in Nanjing to Honolulu.
 United States Secretary of Homeland Security Jeh Johnson announces that he has reassigned the acting administrator of the Transportation Security Administration, Melvin Carraway, after media reports that TSA inspectors had failed to detect mock explosives and weapons smuggled through TSA checkpoints at airports in the United States in 67 out of 70 tests by undercover agents, a greater than 95 percent failure rate.

2 June
 A spokesman for Almaz-Antey, the manufacturer of the Russian Buk surface-to-air missile system, announces that it has concluded that an older version of the system exported to Ukraine and not in service with the Russian armed forces shot down Malaysia Airlines Flight 17 in July 2014, implying that the Ukrainian armed forces must have shot it down. Russian officials previously had alleged that a Ukrainian Air Force aircraft shot down the airliner.
 A computer automation problem grounds 150 United Airlines flights – about eight percent of United's morning schedule – nationwide in the United States for about 40 minutes until the airline can ensure that all flights depart with proper dispatching information.
 Landing his de Havilland Canada DHC-1 Chipmunk at Pearson International Airport in Toronto, Ontario, Canada, retired de Havilland Canada test pilot George Neal sets the world record for oldest active licensed pilot at the age of 96 years 194 days. Neal had held a Canadian pilot's license since 1936 and flown 15,000 hours on 150 different aircraft types.

3 June
 Solar Impulse 2 pilot André Borschberg announces that the aircraft will be delayed in Japan for at least a week while damage to its left aileron caused by wind gusts on the ground at Nagoya Airfield is repaired.
 United States Deputy Secretary of State Antony Blinken tells France Inter radio that airstrikes in Iraq and Syria by the U.S.-led coalition have killed 10,000 Islamic State combat personnel over the previous nine months. White House Press Secretary Josh Earnest does not dispute the figure, adding that 1,000 ISIS combat personnel had been killed in airstrikes related to the siege of Kobane alone.
 Syrian government airstrikes hit Islamic State targets in al-Shaddadah, Syria.
 In the United States, the National Aeronautics and Space Administration (NASA) announces that it has funded eight new studies covering a wide range of topics related to its plans to develop a quiet, "low-boom" supersonic demonstration passenger aircraft that will make only a soft thump instead of a loud and damaging sonic boom when flying at supersonic speeds, allowing it to fly over populated areas at such speeds.

5 June
 Aircraft of the Saudi-led coalition strike Houthi and other rebel positions in Yemen in Sana'a, Ibb, Ataq, and the Dhi Na'im District.

7 June
 At least three predawn airstrikes by the Saudi-led coalition hit the rebel-held headquarters of the Yemeni armed forces in Sana'a, badly damaging it and killing at least 22 people. The strikes also damage several nearby homes.

8 June
 Syrian government aircraft conduct two raids against a public square in the village of Janoudiyeh in Idlib Governorate, killing at least 49 and perhaps as many as 60 people.
 Air Lituanica files for bankruptcy. It had ceased flight operations on 22 May.

8–9 June (overnight)
 The Saudi-led coalition conducts heavy airstrikes against rebel positions in Aden, Ataq, and Saada, Yemen.

9 June
 A series of airstrikes by the Saudi-led coalition against targets in Sana'a hit the rebel-held Yemeni Ministry of Defense building and the homes of Yemeni military leaders allied with the Houthi rebels. Another 121 coalition aircraft strike rebel targets in eight other Yemeni governorates. The strikes kill dozens of people.

10 June
 The United States Environmental Protection Agency (EPA) issues an "endangerment finding" suggesting that aircraft engines may "contribute to the air pollution that causes climate change and endangers public health and welfare," its first move to start the process of regulating greenhouse gas emissions by airliners in the United States. The endangerment finding does not cover military aircraft or smaller commercial aircraft such as turboprops, but the EPA describes it as the initial step in adoption within the United States of international carbon dioxide emission standards for airliners that the International Civil Aviation Organization plans to promulgate in early 2016.

11 June
 The Syrian government reports that one of its combat jets has crashed in eastern Daraa Governorate. The Southern Front claims to have shot it down.

12 June
 A U.S. Central Intelligence Agency unmanned aerial vehicle strike in Yemen's Hadhramaut Governorate kills Nasir al-Wuhayshi, second-in-command of al-Qaeda and leader of al-Qaeda in the Arabian Peninsula. The United States Department of Defense will confirm his death on 16 June.

13 June
 Two United States Air Force F-15 Eagles conduct an airstrike in Libya targeting Mokhtar Belmokhtar, the leader of the Signed In Blood Battalion and former senior member of al Qaeda in the Islamic Maghreb. dropping several 500-pound (227-kg) bombs. The Government of Libya announces the next day that the strike has killed Belmokhtar and several other Islamic militants, although the United States does not immediately confirm his death.

15 June
 A U.S. airstrike in Mosul, Iraq, kills Islamic State operative Ali Awni al-Harzi.

16 June
 A U.S. unmanned aerial vehicle conducts an air-to-ground missile strike in Al-Shaddadah, Syria, that kills Islamic State operative Tariq bin al-Tahar bin al-Falih al-'Awni al-Harzi, the brother of Ali Awni al-Harzi, who a U.S. airstrike killed the previous day in Iraq.
 Airstrikes in Yemen by the Saudi-led coalition hit rebel targets in Sana'a and in Hajjah, Saada, Jawf, and Shabwa governorates.

18 June
 Over Moorslede, Belgium, wingsuit fliers set a new formation record, with a formation of 42 people.

22 June
Horner was the sole occupant of the plane.

25 June

28 June
 After a 27-day stay in Nagoya, Japan, to await favorable weather, Solar Impulse 2 departs Nagoya Airfield with André Borschberg at the controls for the eighth leg of its attempt to become the first solar-powered aircraft to fly around the world, a planned non-stop solo flight by Borschberg of over four days to Honolulu, Hawaii.
 SpaceX's planned third attempt to guide a Falcon 9 rocket booster to a soft landing on a barge in the Atlantic Ocean off Florida fails to take place after the rocket explodes during its boost phase two minutes after launch from Cape Canaveral, Florida.

30 June
 An Indonesian Air Force Lockheed C-130 Hercules crashes in a residential area in Medan, Indonesia, just after takeoff from Soewondo Air Force Base, striking a busy road, homes, and a hotel. The crash kills all 122 people on the plane and 19 people on the ground.
 United Airlines announces what it calls the largest investment in alternative fuels by a U.S. airline, buying a $30 million stake in Fulcrum BioEnergy. The two companies plan to build as many as five factories near United Airlines hub cities to convert garbage into jet fuel.
 As part of an intensified air campaign against Taliban insurgents in eastern Afghanistan, the U.S. armed forces have conducted 106 airstrikes in June, more than double the number in May. Since 1 January, the U.S. armed forces and international forces have carried out 305 airstrikes in Afghanistan.

July

1 July
 A new terminal for international civilian flights, Terminal 2, opens at Pyongyang International Airport in Pyongyang, North Korea.
 During attacks by Islamic militants in Egypt's Sinai Peninsula, Egyptian F-16 Fighting Falcons and AH-64 Apaches conduct airstrikes against concentrations of militants in the Sheikh Zuweid area.
 The United States Department of Justice confirms that it is investigating whether large airlines in the United States have colluded to keep air fares high by limiting routes and affordable seats. Delta Air Lines, Southwest Airlines, American Airlines, and United Airlines confirm that they are among the airlines under investigation. Air fares in the United States are at a 12-year high even though airlines have saved billions of dollars in fuels costs thanks to historically low jet fuel prices.

2 July
 Dawn raids by Egyptian Air Force aircraft on Egyptian territory in the Sinai Peninsula just south of Rafah kill 23 Islamic militants.
 Two days of Syrian government airstrikes against rebel forces begin during a rebel offensive against Aleppo, Syria.

3 July
 Iraqi jets drop hundreds of thousands of leaflets over Mosul, Iraq. Issued in the name of the Iraqi Army, the leaflets promise that the Government of Iraq soon would drive Islamic State forces out of Mosul.
 Airstrikes by the Saudi-led coalition against rebel targets in Yemen kill at least six people in Sana'a's al Jaraf neighborhood and at least 10 people in Bayt al-Faqih, according to Houthi rebels. Coalition aircraft also strike the Ministry of Communications building in Sana'a and a military base and weapons depot on Faj Attan mountain overlooking Sanaa. Some reports also attribute an explosion at the public library in Hodeida that kills eight Houthis to an airstrike.
 Colombian wingsuit flying multiple-record holder Jhonathan Florez dies in a BASE jumping training accident at Engelberg, Switzerland. 
 With André Borschberg at the controls, Solar Impulse 2 completes the eighth leg of its attempt to become the first solar-powered aircraft to fly around the world, landing at Kalaeloa Airport in Kalaeloa, Hawaii, outside Honolulu, after a nonstop, solo flight from Nagoya Airfield in Nagoya, Japan. The flight sets new world records for non-stop distance and flight duration by a manned, solar-powered aircraft. Borschberg also sets a new world duration record for an unrefueled solo airplane flight, breaking the previous record of 76 hours 43 minutes set by Steve Fossett in January 2006 during a flight in a single-seat jet.

4 July
 During the morning, Syrian Air Force aircraft conduct 15 strikes against rebel positions in support of a major offensive by the Syrian Arab Army and Hizbollah against rebel forces in al-Zabadani, Syria.
 Egyptian airstrikes kill 25 Islamic militants near Sheikh Zuweid in the northern Sinai Peninsula.

4–5 July (overnight)
 At least 16 airstrikes by the U.S.-led coalition hit Islamic State targets in Raqqa, Syria, in what the coalition describes as "one of the largest deliberate engagements we have conducted to date in Syria." The Islamic State claims that the strikes killed 10 people and wounded 10 others.

5 July
 A U.S. airstrike near Aleppo, Syria, kills David Drugeon, the leader of the Khorasan Group.
 Suspected drug traffickers open fire on a patrolling Mexican Navy helicopter as it approaches a group of their vehicles near Falcon Lake in Tamaulipas, Mexico. The helicopter crew returns fire, killing six people on the ground.
 Aboard a lawn chair tied to over a hundred helium balloons, Daniel Bloria reaches an estimated altitude of  during an unauthorized flight over Calgary, Alberta, Canada. He plans to parachute into the infield of the Stampede Grandstand at Stampede Park during the Calgary Stampede's chuckwagon races, but instead comes down southeast of Stampede Park and is arrested. Accused of endangering flights at Calgary International Airport, Boria will be fined for his stunt in March 2017.

6 July
 An Iraqi Air Force Sukhoi Su-25 (NATO reporting name "Frogfoot") returning from a raid against Islamic State forces in Iraq's Al Anbar Governorate with a bomb on board that had failed to drop accidentally releases the bomb over a residential area of Baghdad, killing at least eight people on the ground. Some reports place the death toll at 12. Later reports place the casualty figures at 76 dead and 38 injured in two airstrikes on markets during the day.
 A large airstrike by the Saudi-led coalition targeting rebel forces in Yemen strikes a marketplace in Fayoush, a suburb of Aden, killing 45 civilians and wounding 50 others. The strike is one of many during the day that hit targets in Sana'a and elsewhere in nine of Yemen's governorates.
 A U.S. airstrike in northwestern Syria kills Muhsin al-Fadhli, the leader of the Khorasan Group, as he travels in a ground vehicle.

7 July
 An air-to-ground missile strike by a U.S. unmanned aerial vehicle kills more than two dozen Islamic militants in Afghanistan's Nangahar Province. Islamic State spokesman Shahidullah Shahid is among the dead. Islamic militant Gul Zaman also dies in a strike on either 6 or 7 July.

8 July
 A U.S. airstrike kills Muhsin al-Fadhli, the leader of the Khorasan Group, as he rides in a vehicle near Sarmada, Syria. The United States Department of Defense does not announce his death in the strike until 21 July.
 At the request of United Airlines after a router malfunction occurs in its reservation system, the U.S. Federal Aviation Administration imposes a 1-hour 49-minute ground-stop on all United flights. The temporary grounding affects 4,900 United flights and 400,000 passengers worldwide and causes major delays at United's hubs at O'Hare International Airport in Chicago, Illinois, George Bush Intercontinental Airport in Houston, Texas, and Denver International Airport in Denver, Colorado.

9 July
 An eruption of Mount Raung in East Java, Indonesia, forces the closure of five airports on Java, Bali, and Lombok through 10 July because of volcanic ash in the atmosphere, greatly disrupting air traffic in the area as flights at the airports are cancelled through late in the day on 10 July. Coming when many Australians travel to Bali on vacation and many Indonesians travel for the Eid al-Fitr holiday, the airport closures strand thousands of travelers.
 
 An air-to-ground missile, suspected of being fired from a U.S. unmanned aerial vehicle, kills four members of al-Qaeda in the Arabian Peninsula as they ride in a car in Mukalla, Yemen.

10 July
 A U.S. unmanned aerial vehicle strike in the Achin District of Afghanstan's Nangahar Province kills at least 30 Islamic militants. Although some reports claim the leader of the Islamic State in Afghanistan and Pakistan, Hafiz Saeed Khan, is among the dead, he in fact survives.
 A United Nations-backed ceasefire of approximately one week – scheduled to end at the conclusion of Ramadan on 17 July – begins at midnight in Yemen to allow the delivery of humanitarian aid to people in need in the country. Within an hour, the ceasefire is broken as fighting breaks out in Taiz and the Saudi-led coalition responds with airstrikes against rebel forces in the area.
 The U.S.-led coalition conducts 34 airstrikes against Islamic State targets in Iraq and Syria, with 17 strikes in each country. Twelve of the strikes in Syria target Islamic State forces around al-Hasakah. In Iraq, four of the strikes hit targets near Mosul, while the other 13 strikes target Islamic States forces in or near seven other cities.
The flight is made on the same route as that Louis Bleriot used made when he made the first crossing of the English Channel in an airplane on 25 July 1909, but in the opposite direction.

11 July
 The Saudi-led coalition conducts airstrikes against rebels in Aden, Sana'a, and Taiz, Yemen. A spokesman for the coalition explains that the coalition had never agreed to honor the one-week United Nations ceasefire imposed on 10 July because the government of deposed Yemeni president Abed Rabbo Mansour Hadi had not sent the coalition instructions to honor it.
 Syrian Arab Army helicopters drop barrel bombs on a residential area and a crowded market in al-Bab, Syria, killing at least 28 people.

11–12 July (overnight)
 The Saudi-led coalition conducts airstrikes in Yemen's Al Bayda Governorate – killing a family of eight riding in several vehicles – and in Taiz, killing two civilians. A coalition spokesman says that the coalition would not honor the ceasefire begun on 10 July because of a lack of Houthi rebel commitment to it and because no United Nations observers had arrived in Yemen to monitor it.

12 July
 The U.S.-led coalition conducts 29 airstrikes against 67 Islamic State targets in Ramadi, Iraq, in preparation for a major ground offensive against Islamic State forces in al Anbar Governorate by Iraqi Army forces, Iraqi police, Shiite militias, and local Sunni tribal forces that begins the following day.
 The Saudi-led coalition conducts airstrikes in several governorates of Yemen. The strikes destroy a conference hall used by Houthi rebels in Sana'a, killing at least 12 people; damage a cement factory in 'Amran Governorate, killing three and wounding 10; and strike rebel targets in Saada Governorate and Lahj Governorate.

13 July
 An airstrike by the Saudi-led coalition targeting rebel forces in Yemen hits slums in the Sawan neighborhood of Sana'a several hundred meters from a rebel military camp, killing 25 civilians and wounding 50.

14 July 2015
 Following several days of "preparatory airstrikes" by the Saudi-led coalition, pro-government forces in Yemen take control of Aden International Airport in Aden from Houthi rebels.
 Intense fighting breaks out between Ukrainian Army troops and rebel forces of the separatist Donetsk People's Republic over the destroyed Donetsk Sergey Prokofiev International Airport in Donetsk, Ukraine.

15 July
 To deter Europeans from travelling to fight for the Islamic State or returning to Europe from the Middle East to conduct terrorist attacks in Europe, the European Parliament passes the "Passenger Name Record" proposal requiring airlines to transfer passenger data such as seat numbers and payment information to law enforcement authorities for flights into and out of the European Union. The proposal must undergo a further period of negotiation with the governments of individual European Union member countries before becoming law.
 A U.S. unmanned aerial vehicle fires an air-to-ground missile at an al-Shabaab force near Bardhere, Somalia, as it advances toward a joint U.S.-African Union ground force. The strike kills or wounds several al-Shabaab personnel; and senior al-Shabaab commander Ismael Jabhad is among the dead.
 Twelve days after Solar Impulse 2 arrived at Kalaeola, Hawaii, completing the eighth leg of its attempt to become the first solar-powered aircraft to fly around the world, the Solar Impulse team announces that it will not attempt the ninth leg of the flight until at least April 2016 due to irreversible battery damage caused by overheating during the first day of its flight to Hawaii from Nagoya, Japan. In the meantime, the team will store Solar Impulse 2 in a University of Hawaii hangar at Kalaeloa Airport in Kalaeloa while it makes repairs to the aircraft and researches and tests new cooling methods to prevent a recurrence of the damage.

16 July
 Airstrikes by the U.S.-led coalition support a drive by Kurdish forces that besieges Islamic State forces in al-Hasakah, Syria.

18 July
 The Commander, United States Pacific Fleet, Admiral Scott H. Swift, rides aboard a United States Navy P-8A Poseidon as it flies a patrol mission over the South China Sea. Swift makes the flight in order to witness the capabilities of the P-8A, but observers believe that his presence aboard the P-8A will rankle China, which claims most of the South China Sea as its territorial waters.

19 July
 Aircraft of the U.S.-led coalition drop leaflets over Islamic State-held Raqqa, Syria, which serves as the de facto capital of the Islamic State. The leaflets promise that "freedom will come" to the area.

20 July
 A strike by a United States Army AH-64 Apache attack helicopter targeting Taliban insurgents in the Baraki Barak District of Afghanistan's Logar Province mistakenly hits an Afghan National Army outpost instead, killing eight and wounding five Afghan soldiers. Some reports put the death toll as high as 14.
 Lockheed Martin announces a deal to buy helicopter maker Sikorsky Aircraft from the United Technologies Corporation for $9,000,000,000. The move will make Lockheed Martin a producer of helicopters for the first time.

21 July
 FedEx, the world's largest air cargo carrier, announces that it will buy 3,000,000 U.S. gallons (2,497,751 imperial gallons; 11,355,000 liters) of biofuels per year from Red Rock Biofuels beginning in 2017. Although it is only a fraction of the 90,000,000 U.S. gallons (74,932,530 imperial gallons; 340,650,000 liters) of jet fuel that FedEx uses each year, FedEx says that it is a first step toward its goal of using alternative fuels for 30 percent of its jet fuel by 2030. Southwest Airlines, the largest domestic air carrier in the United States, had signed a biofuel deal with Red Rock Biofuels in 2014.

22 July
 A Royal Saudi Air Force transport plane becomes the first aircraft to land at Yemen's Aden International Airport since March, carrying humanitarian aid for people in Aden. It is the first flight in what officials in Aden hope will become a regular series of military transport flights to assist people in Yemen.

23 July
 Significant fighting erupts between Islamic State and Turkish military forces for the first time as they exchange gun and artillery fire near the Kilis border crossing on the Turkey-Syria border. The Turkish Air Force scrambles four F-16 Fighting Falcons to the area to support Turkish ground troops.
 In a major reversal of policy, the Government of Turkey announces that it will allow the United States to use Incirlik Air Base in Turkey as a base for airstrikes against the Islamic State in Syria; previously, it had allowed U.S. aircraft to use Incirlik as a base only for surveillance flights over Syria. Basing at Incirlik will allow U.S. aircraft to move more quickly and efficiently against Islamic State targets in northwestern Syria.
 Aircraft of the Saudi-led coalition carry out airstrikes in Dar Saad, Yemen, north of Aden.
 Allegiant Air Flight 426, a McDonnell Douglas MD-80 with 144 people on board flying from McCarran International Airport in Las Vegas, Nevada, arrives over its destination, Hector International Airport in Fargo, North Dakota, low on fuel and finds the airport temporarily closed for training by the United States Navy Blue Angels flight demonstration squadron. After a discussion between the pilot and tower about how Allegiant Air should have known about the closure and options for Flight 426 to circle or divert to another airport, the Allegiant Air pilot announces that he has insufficient fuel for either option, declares a fuel emergency, and lands safely at Hector International.

24 July
 Aircraft of the Saudi-led coalition target Houthi and other rebel positions in Yemen as ground fighting rages in Marib Governorate, Taiz, and north of Aden. In Taiz Governorate, dozens of the airstrikes hit a residential area of Mokha, flattening many homes, starting a large fire, and killing at least 80 civilians and injuring at least another 150.
 Turkish Air Force jets bomb Islamic State targets in Syria for the first time, as three Turkish F-16 Fighting Falcons conduct early-morning strikes on two Islamic State headquarters and a gathering of Islamic State combat personnel. The strikes come two days after Islamic State forces fatally shot a Turkish soldier along the Turkey-Syria border.
 The United States Department of Transportation announces that it has begun an investigation into possible price gouging by American Airlines, Delta Air Lines, JetBlue, Southwest Airlines, and United Airlines during a disruption of passenger rail service in the northeastern United States after the fatal derailment of an Amtrak passenger train on 12 May. The investigation covers flights at 11 airports located between Boston, Massachusetts, and Washington, D.C., including six of the busiest airports in the United States. The Department of Transportation says that it is its first such investigation in at least 12 years and that it may even be unprecedented.

24–25 July (overnight)
 Turkish Air Force jets attack both Islamic State targets in Syria and weapons depots and camps of the Kurdistan Workers Party (KPP) in Iraqi Kurdistan. The strikes against the PKK end a two-year ceasefire between Turkey and the PKK, which the Turkish government declares null and void after repeated PKK violations.

25 July
 The Saudi-led coalition announces that it will begin a five-day ceasefire in Yemen at 23:59 Yemen time on 26 July, although it reserves the right to respond with force to rebel violations of the ceasefire. Deposed President of Yemen Abd-Rabbu Mansour Hadi had requested the ceasefire to allow humanitarian aid to reach people in Yemen.

27 July
 On the second full day of the Saudi-led coalition's five-day humanitarian ceasefire in Yemen, the coalition conducts airstrikes near al-Anad Air Base in Yemen's Lahj Governorate and north of Aden in response to ground fighting that had broken out within minutes of the ceasefire taking effect. Two of the airstrikes around al-Anad mistakenly kill 15 troops allied with the coalition.

28 July
 Turkish Air Force jets bomb Kurdish Workers Party (PKK) positions in Turkey's Şırnak Province in after PKK forces fire on Turkish ground troops there.

29 July
 Aircraft wreckage which appears to be a flaperon – part of the flap system – of a Boeing 777 is found washed up on a beach on Réunion in the Indian Ocean, raising hopes that it is the first piece of wreckage of Malaysia Airlines Flight 370 to be found since the aircraft vanished in March 2014.
 An Israeli unmanned aerial vehicle strikes a car in Hader, Syria, with an air-to-ground missile. Various reports place the death toll in the strike at two (both militiamen who supported the Syrian government regime of Bashar al-Assad), three (all innocent villagers), and five (two members of Hezbollah and three pro-Assad militiamen).

30 July
 Facebook announces that it will begin testing the full-size version of its Aquila unmanned aerial vehicle later in the year.

31 July
 U.S. aircraft strike Jabhat al-Nusra forces in Syria ins response to a Jabhat-al-Nusra attack against Division 30, a U.S.-trained Syrian opposition group. It is the first time U.S. aircraft have conducted an airstrike in Syria to protect forces the United States has trained.
 An Embraer Phenom 300 (registration HZ-IBN) crashes into a car auction warehouse while attempting to land at Blackbushe Airport in Yateley, Hampshire, England after a flight from Milan–Malpensa Airport in Milan, Italy, and catches fire. The crash leaves all four occupants of the aircraft dead and destroys a number of cars.
 A Colombian Air Force CASA CN-235 carrying Colombian military personnel suffers engine failure and crashes at Codazzi, Colombia, killing all 11 people on board.
 The United States Marine Corps announces that the F-35B Lightning II, its version of the F-35 Lightning II Joint Strike Fighter, is combat ready and "ready for worldwide deployment." It is the first version of the F-35 to become operational.
They set a new world record for the largest formation skydive, breaking the previous record set by a team of 138 skydivers in 2012. It was the team's 13th attempt to break the 2012 record.

August
Yemenia resumes flights to Yemen with a flight from Saudi Arabia to Aden International Airport in Aden.

3 August
 During Syrian Air Force airstrikes on Ariha, Syria, a Syrian jet crashes into a crowded marketplace, killing at least 27 and perhaps as many as 30 people and injuring at least 55 and perhaps over 60 people.
 The United States Department of Defense announces that over the preceding weekend the United States has begun operating armed aircraft from Turkey's Incirlik Air Base over Syria. Previously, the Government of Turkey had allowed the United States to operate only unarmed surveillance aircraft from Incirlik.
 The independent monitoring group Airwars reports that airstrikes in Iraq and Syria by the U.S.-led coalition have killed 459 civilians and over 15,000 Islamic State personnel since they began in Iraq on 8 August 2014 and in Syria on 23 September 2014, and that 57 airstrikes killed civilians and caused 48 "friendly fire" deaths. In the 5,800 airstrikes the coalition has conducted, the United States has confirmed that coalition airstrikes have killed only two civilians and injured two others, although its investigations of other reported civilian deaths continue.
 On the day that the comment period on the complaint to the U.S. Government by American Airlines, Delta Air Lines, and United Airlines that Qatar and the United Arab Emirates violate "open skies" agreements by subsidizing Emirates, Etihad Airways, and Qatar Airways on routes between those countries and the United States and through overcapacity on those routes, Atlas Air Cargo, FedEx, Hawaiian Airlines, and JetBlue go on record as opposing the American-Delta-United coalition's complaint, claiming in a letter to United States Secretary of Transportation Anthony Foxx and United States Secretary of Commerce Penny Pritzker that they and other smaller U.S. carriers have benefited from the existing "open skies" agreements and that American, Delta, and United are trying to coerce Qatar and the United Arab Emirates into reducing the access of Eirates, Etihad, and Qatar Airways to the U.S. market.

4 August
 Les Munro, the last surviving pilot who participated in Operation Chastise, the 1943 "Dambuster" raid by the Royal Air Force's No. 617 Squadron, dies in New Zealand at the age of 96.
 Japan announces that it is suspending construction of a new airbase on Okinawa intended to replace Marine Corps Air Station Futenma in Naha to allow time for discussion between central and local government officials of the new base and the future of the U.S. military presence on Okinawa.
 The United States conducts its first airstrike in Syria from Turkish soil, an air-to-ground missile strike by an unmanned aerial vehicle operating from Turkey's Incirlik Air Base. The U.S. Department of Defense announces the strike the following day.
 A Colombian government UH-60 Black Hawk helicopter involved in a counter-narcotics operation against the Clan Úsuga criminal organization crashes into the side of a mountain in northwestern Colombia, killing 16 policemen.

5 August
 Prime Minister of Malaysia Najib Razak announces that a flaperon found on a beach on Réunion in the Indian Ocean on 29 July is from Malaysia Airlines Flight 370, a Boeing 777 which vanished in March 2014.

6 August
 Malaysia's Minister of Transportation, Liow Tiong Lai, announces that more aircraft debris – including a window and some aluminum foil – that may be from Malaysia Airlines Flight 370 has been discovered washed up on Réunion.
 At least 17 people, including 12 Afghan Army soldiers, die in the crash of a helicopter in Afghanistan's Zabul Province.
 A Pakistani military helicopter crashes in Pakistan's Khyber Pakhtunkhwa province, resulting in at least 11 deaths.

11 August
 Dutch prosecutors announce that investigators probing the July 2014 crash of Malaysian Airlines Flight 17 have identified possible Russian-made Buk surface-to-air missile parts mixed in with the airliner's wreckage. Ukraine and many in the West have accused pro-Russian rebels in eastern Ukraine with shooting down the airliner using a surface-to-air missile system supplied by Russia, which Russia and the rebels deny.

12 August
 A suspected U.S. air-to-ground missile strike by an unmanned aerial vehicle kills five al-Qaeda in the Arabian Peninsula members as they ride in a car on a coastal highway east of Mukalla, Yemen.
 The U.S. Federal Aviation Administration announces that pilot sightings of unmanned aerial vehicles have increased from 238 in all of 2014 to "more than 650" between 1 January and 9 August 2015. Monthly sightings have increased from 16 during June 2014 and 36 during July 2014 to 138 – some at altitudes of up to  – during June 2015 and 137 during July 2015.

15 August
 The internationally recognized government of Libya asks what it calls the "Arab brother states" to conduct airstrikes against Islamic State forces in Sirte, Libya.
New York City-area airports experience delays, and at Washington Dulles International Airport in Fairfax County, Virginia, 154 flights are delayed and five percent are cancelled by early evening. The disruption hits Ronald Reagan Washington National Airport in Arlington, Virginia, and Baltimore-Washington International Thurgood Marshall Airport in Baltimore, Maryland, particularly hard; dozens of their flights – about 25 percent – are canceled. Some stranded passengers do not reach their destinations until the next day. Overall, the outage delays 492 flights and prompts the cancellation of 476, cutting traffic at Baltimore-Washington to 70 percent, at Reagan National to 72 percent, and at Washington Dulles to 88 percent of normal, and Washington Dulles continues to experience two-hour delays the following day.

16 August
Trigana Air Service Flight 267, an ATR 72-300 with 54 people aboard on a domestic flight in Indonesia from Sentani Airport in Jayapura to Oksibil crashes into a mountain in the Bintang highlands region of the Indonesian province of Papua on New Guinea. All on board die, making it the deadliest accident in the history of Trigana Air Service, as well as the deadliest accident to date involving an ATR 72.
In one of the deadliest airstrikes of the Syrian Civil war, Syrian government aircraft bomb a market in rebel-held Douma, killing at least 80 and perhaps as many as 100 people and injuring 300.
 The U.S. Federal Aviation Administration records an unprecedented 12 reported instances of unmanned aerial vehicles (UAVs) interfering with air traffic over the United States in a single day. Commercial and general aviation pilots and aircrews report close mid-air encounters with UAVs over California, the District of Columbia, Florida, Illinois, Kentucky, New Mexico, North Carolina, and Texas. A boom in sales of small, largely unregulated, privately owned UAVs has led to a rapid increase in such incidents; only two years earlier, encounters between UAVs and conventional air traffic were unheard of.

17 August
 Pakistani airstrikes in North Waziristan destroy an ammunition cache and kill 50 Islamic militants. Additional airstrikes in the Khyber Agency kill another 15 militants.
 French authorities call off an unsuccessful 10-day search employing a plane, helicopters, and a ship covering a  area of the Indian Ocean in Réunion's coastal waters and along Réunion's beaches looking for additional debris from Malaysian Airlines Flight 370.

18 August
 A U.S. airstrike kills the second-in-command of the Islamic State, Fadhil Ahmad al-Hayali, better known as Hajji Mutazz, as he rides in a ground vehicle near Mosul, Iraq.

20 August
The accident kills seven people – two crewmembers aboard each plane and three parachutists aboard one of them – but the other 31 people aboard the two planes parachute to safety. Five of them are treated for injuries. One of the dead crew members is former Slovak ice hockey player Michal Česnek.

20–21 August
 After four rockets are fired from Syrian territory into northern Israel on 20 August, Israeli Air Force aircraft join Israeli Defense Forces artillery in striking more than a dozen military installations in southern Syria over the course of two days. An Israeli airstrike on the morning of 21 August strikes a ground vehicle  inside Syria, killing five people riding in it that Israel claims were members of an Islamic Jihad Movement in Palestine rocket-launch crew.
 A wave of airstrikes by the Saudi-led coalition targeting rebel forces during heavy fighting in Taiz, Yemen, over the course of two days beginning on 20 August kill as many as 65 people.

21 August
 The United Kingdom conducts its first military action in Syria, using a Royal Air Force unmanned aerial vehicle to conduct an air-to-ground missile strike against a car in Raqqa, killing three Islamic State members, two of them British citizens. Prime Minister David Cameron will announce the strike publicly on 7 September.

22 August
 A Hawker Hunter T7 performing aerobatics at the Shoreham Airshow at Shoreham Airport in Shoreham-by-Sea, West Sussex, England, crashes onto the A27 road, striking several ground vehicles. The crash destroys eight ground vehicles and kills at least 11 people – including two players from the English football team Worthing United F.C. – and injures 16 others. It is the deadliest air show accident in the United Kingdom since a crash at the 1952 Farnborough Airshow which killed 31 people.

23 August
An investigation concludes that the missile – also witnessed by another Thomson Airways plane approaching Sharm el-Sheikh – was an Egyptian armed forces missile that had strayed from a military exercise. The aircraft's passengers are not informed of the incident, and the press does not report it until 6 November.

26 August
 Airstrikes by the U.S.-led coalition support an offensive by Iraqi Kurdish peshmerga forces that takes ten villages in Iraq's Kirkuk Governorate from the Islamic State.
 Russia and Syria sign a treaty which among other things grants Russia a permanent airbase in Syria at Khmeimim. Russia will ratify the treaty on 7 October 2016.

27 August
 In response to the Taliban's seizure of the Musa Qala District in Afghanistan's Helmand Province the previous day, U.S. aircraft conduct multiple strikes against Taliban forces in the district. Over a dozen U.S. airstrikes have taken place in the district between 25 and 27 August.

30 August
 The Saudi-led coalition conducts an airstrike against a building in Yemen's Hajjah Governorate, killing 36 people. Local residents claim the dead were civilians working in a bottling plant, but the coalition responds that the raid killed people at a site the Houthi rebels use to make improvised explosive devices and train recruits.
 Aircraft of the Saudi-led coalition strike a house near a military base in Sana'a, Yemen, killing four people.

31 August
 In violation of U.S. Federal Aviation Administration rules, American Airlines mistakenly flies an Airbus A321S, a version of the Airbus A321 that is not ETOPS-certified for long flights over water, from Los Angeles, California, to Hawaii, not discovering the error until the airliner had made half the flight. The plane completes the flight to Hawaii, then returns empty to Los Angeles. The airline makes computer software changes that it says will prevent future mix-ups between the A321S and Ameerican's fleet of ETOPS-certified A321H airliners.

September

 During the month, the U.S. Federal Aviation Administration expands its prohibition of the flying of unmanned aerial vehicles (UAVs) in the Washington, D.C., area from within a 15-mile (24.2-km) radius of Ronald Reagan Washington National Airport – put in place after the terrorist attacks of 11 September 2001 – to within a 30-mile (48.3-km) radius of the airport. A lack of publicity for the expansion of the no-fly area leads to many UAV hobbyists remaining unaware of it until late December.
 During the month, the United States quietly closes its military unmanned aerial vehicle base at Arba Minch Airport in Arba Minch in southern Ethiopia. It will not publicly announce the closure of the base, which had operated since 2011, until January 2016.

1 September
 United States Government officials acknowledge that the U.S. Central Intelligence Agency and Joint Special Operations Command are engaged in a joint lethal unmanned aerial vehicle campaign targeting terrorism suspects in Syria independent of the U.S.-led coalition air campaigns against the Islamic State there.

3 September
 The Paris prosecutor in France announces that a technician from Airbus Defence and Space in Spain had confirmed that a flaperon found washed up on Réunion in the Indian Ocean on 29 July was from the Boeing 777 that disappeared in March 2014 while operating as Malaysian Airlines Flight 370. Airbus Defence and Space had manufactured the flaperon for Boeing.

5 September
 In response to an attack in Yemen by Houthi rebels the previous day that killed 60 soldiers of the Saudi-led coalition including 45 Emiratis, United Arab Emirates Air Force jets conduct heavy predawn raids on Houthi positions in Ma'rib Governorate, a land-mine-making plant in Sa'dah Governorate, and military camps and weapon depots in Sana'a and Ibb.
 Over eastern Senegal, Ceiba Intercontinental Airlines Flight 71, a Boeing 737-8FB (registration 3C-LLY) flying from Dakar, Senegal, to Cotonou, Benin, collides with a Senegal Airlines Hawker Siddeley HS125-700A air ambulance (registration 6V-AIM) flying from Ouagadougou, Burkina Faso, to Dakar. The Boeing 737 suffers only minor damage and diverts to Malabo, Equatorial Guinea, where it lands safely. All seven people aboard the air ambulance die.

6 September
 At least 11 Afghan counternarcotics police officers are killed and four others are injured in the Garmsir District of Afghanistan's Helmand Province in what the Government of Afghanistan claims was an international airstrike. Some reports place the death toll as high as 28. The United States denies any international involvement, countering that international coalition aircraft struck targets in Maiwand District in Kandahar Province but none in Helmand Province during the day.
 The Iraqi Air Force uses F-16 Fighting Falcons it acquired in July to conduct its first strikes against Islamic State forces, hitting Islamic State positions in Iraq.
 Strikes by aircraft of the Saudi-led coalition targeting Houthi and other rebel positions in northern Yemen accidentally kill 20 people attending a wake for a person the Houthis had killed.
 After Kurdistan Workers' Party (PKK) attacks near Dağlıca in Turkey's Hakkâri Province kill 16 Turkish soldiers and wound six others, the Turkish Air Force conducts airstrikes against PKK targets in southeastern Turkey and northern Iraq and against Islamic State targets in Syria. The following day, the Government of Turkey will announce that four F-16 Fighting Falcon and three F-4 Phantom II aircraft carried out the raids against the PKK targets, striking six caves, two storage facilities, three shelters, and 12 anti-aircraft machine guns.

7 September
 Pakistan uses an unmanned aerial vehicle to conduct an air-to-ground missile strike for the first time, when a NESCOM Burraq unmanned combat aerial vehicle uses a laser-guided missile to kill three suspected terrorists in the Shawal Valley in northwestern Pakistan.
 President of France François Hollande announces that France will begin aerial reconnaissance missions over Syria on 8 September and is considering conducting airstrikes against Islamic State targets in Syria.

8 September
 Aircraft of the Saudi-led coalition bomb boats off the coast of Yemen. According to India's Ministry of External Affairs, aircraft attack two boats on a voyage from Somalia to Yemen carrying a combined 20 Indian crewmen, leaving seven of the crewmen missing. The Yemen Coast Guard reports that warplanes attacked five boats, leaving it unclear whether the two reported incidents are separate events.
 The left engine of British Airways Flight 2276, a Boeing 777-236ER (registration G-VIIO), catches fire while the aircraft waits to take off from McCarran International Airport in Las Vegas, Nevada for a flight to London. All 170 people on board escape the plane via inflatable evacuation slides; 14 of them suffer minor injuries.
 United Airlines announces that its chief executive officer, Jeff Smisek, and two other senior company officials have resigned amid a U.S. Government corruption probe. The probe is looking into allegations that United operated a money-losing nonstop flight – nicknamed the "chairman's flight" – between Newark, New Jersey's Newark Liberty International Airport and Columbia, South Carolina, from September 2012 until 1 April 2014 in order benefit David Samson, who was the chairman of the Port Authority of New York and New Jersey during that period. Samson owned a vacation home near Columbia in Aiken, South Carolina, and was influential in decisions related to infrastructure improvements and cheaper lease rates at Newark Liberty that United desired.

9 September
 Aircraft of the Saudi-led coalition strike targets in Sana'a, Yemen, reportedly killing six civilians and wounding ten.

13 September
 After a convoy of four Egyptian tour company vehicles carrying Mexican tourists stops to hold a barbecue near the Bahariya Oasis in Egypt's Western Desert, Egyptian security forces mistake the group of 22 people for Islamic militants. An Egyptian airplane and helicopters attack the tour group, and Egyptian ground forces fire on its members as they try to flee. The attack kills eight Mexicans and four Egyptians and injures eight Mexicans and two Egyptians.
 Colombia claims that two Venezuelan Air Force jets violated its airspace on 12 September, claiming that they flew nearly  into Colombia and passing over two military bases.

14 September
 President of France François Hollande announces that France will begin airstrikes against the Islamic State in Syria. It previously had limited its airstrikes to Islamic State targets in Iraq.
 During a qualifying race at the National Championship Air Races at Reno Stead Airport in Reno, Nevada, Tom Aberle sets a new biplane speed record, reaching  in his custom biplane Phantom.

15 September
 A South African Beechcraft King Air 200 becomes the first aircraft in history to land at Saint Helena's new Saint Helena Airport. The plane is visiting the island to conduct a series of flights to calibrate the airport's radio navigation equipment.

16 September
 Commercial satellite imagery reveals that eight Russian military helicopters have arrived at Bassel Al-Assad International Airport outside Latakia, Syria. Russia has improved the airport to support military operations and moved military equipment to it over approximately the previous two weeks.

18 September
 Four Russian Federation Air Force Sukhoi Su-27 (NATO reporting name "Flanker") fighters arrive at Bassel Al-Assad International Airport outside Latakia, Syria. A United States Intelligence Community official describes the Russian military build-up at the airport as the first major expeditionary deployment of Soviet or Russian forces outside of territory formerly constituting the Soviet Union since the conclusion of the Soviet–Afghan War in February 1989.
 Gunfire from a sheriff's helicopter kills a man leading police on a car chase in San Bernardino County, California. It is the seventh such incident since sheriff's deputies began receiving training in using weapons from helicopters in the mid-1980s and the first since a shooting in Apple Valley, California, in 2001.
 A Venezuelan Air Force Sukhoi Su-30MK2 flying a drug interdiction mission crashes in Venezuela near the border with Colombia, killing its two-man crew, after an "illicit aircraft" is detected entering Venezuelan airspace from Colombia.

18–19 September (overnight)
 Turkish Air Force jets strike Kurdistan Workers Party (PKK) camps in northern Iraq, killing at least 55 PKK members.

19 September
 Israeli Air Force jets strike targets in the Gaza Strip in response to rocket attacks from the Gaza Strip against Israeli territory the previous evening.
 President of Russia Vladimir Putin announces that he has approved a Russian Ministry of Defense plan to establish a Russian military air base in neighboring Belarus. Russia has not had a full-fledged air base there since Russian forces withdrew from Belarus after the dissolution of the Soviet Union in December 1991. Russia plans to base Russian Federation Air Force Sukhoi Su-27 (NATO reporting name "Flanker") fighters at the base.

21 September
 An airstrike by the Saudi-led coalition attempting to hit a rebel-controlled building in the al-Hasba neighborhood of Sana'a, Yemen, instead destroys an adjacent house, damaging several other buildings and killing at least 15 people. All the dead are members of the same family.

23 September
 Iran's Tasnim News Agency reports that the Islamic Republic of Iran Army has unveiled the Mohajem 92, a new unmanned aerial vehicle (UAV) manufactured by the "self-suffiency department" of the Islamic Republic of Iran Air Force.

25 September
 The Government of Ukraine announces that it will ban all Russian airlines from landing at airports in Ukraine beginning on 25 October and that it is banning Russian aircraft carrying military personnel or military cargo from flying through Ukrainian airspace. The Government of Russia responds with an announcement that it will retaliate by banning Ukrainian airlines from landing at airports in Russia.
 Turkish Air Force jets strike Kurdish Workers Party (PKK) camps in the Gara region of northern Iraq. Turkey claims that the raids kill 19 PKK members.

27 September
 France conducts its first airstrikes in Syria, with six jets destroying an Islamic State training camp near Deir ez-Zor in eastern Syria which the Government of France says posed a threat to France and to Syrian civilians. Previously France had limited its airstrikes to Iraqi territory.
 Airstrikes by the Saudi-led coalition hit arms facilities in several governorates of Yemen, killing 38 Houthi rebels. The Houthis claim that the strikes killed 22 civilians and wounded 13.

28 September
 Taliban forces seize much of Kunduz, Afghanistan, despite the efforts of attack helicopters supporting Afghan government security forces in the city.
 Two air-to-ground missiles strike tents in which a wedding reception is taking place in al-Wahijah in southwestern Yemen, killing 131 people. It is one of the deadliest incidents of the Yemeni Civil War. Yemeni officials blame the Saudi-led coalition for the airstrike, but a spokesman for the Saudi-led coalition denies involvement, saying that the coalition had not conducted air operations in the area in three days.
 The last airworthy Avro Vulcan makes its final air show appearance at the Yorkshire Air Show in Yorkshire, England.

29 September
 A U.S. airstrike against Taliban forces supports an Afghan government counterattack to drive the Taliban out of Kunduz.

30 September
 Russia conducts airstrikes in Syria for the first time, targeting rebel forces. Russia claims that the strikes hit Islamic State military vehicles, communications centers, weapons caches, and ammunition and fuel depots and the Assad regime's Syrian Arab News Agency claims that the strikes targeted Islamic State forces around Homs, but United States Secretary of Defense Ashton Carter says that the strikes occurred in areas in which the Islamic State does not have a presence and a Syrian opposition leader reports that the strikes targeted civilians and killed 37 people.

October 
SATA International is rebranded as Azores Airlines.

1 October
 Eight Russian Federation Air Force Sukhoi Su-24 (NATO reporting name "Fencer") and Sukhoi Su-25 (NATO reporting name "Frogfoot") jets conduct a second day of airstrikes in Syria, claiming to have hit "terrorist staff" and an ammunition dump in Idlib and a headquarters near Hama. The Government of Russia claims the strikes are limited to Islamic State, Nusra Front, and similar terrorist targets, but Syrian activists and United States Government officials criticize the strikes as focusing on other Syrian rebels trying to unseat President of Syria Basher al-Assad.
 Prime Minister of Iraq Haider al-Abadi says that the Government of Iraq would welcome Russian strikes against Islamic State targets in Iraq, but Russian Minister of Foreign Affairs Sergei Lavrov responds that Russia has no interest in expanding its air campaign beyond Syria.
 U.S. and Russian officials hold a video teleconference in which they have their first discussion over how to avoid incidents in Syrian airspace during their separate air campaigns in Syria, covering such issues as which radio frequencies and what languages to use when deconflicting their operations.
 Tracey Curtis-Taylor begins a  solo flight from Farnborough Airport in Farnborough, England, to Sydney, Australia, in the Boeing-Stearman Model 75 open-cockpit biplane Spirit of Artemis, intending to recreate the first solo flight between the United Kingdom and Australia by a woman, the 1930 Croydon-to-Darwin flight of Amy Johnson. Curtis-Taylor will arrive in Sydney on 9 January 2016.
 Boeing and Carnegie Mellon University announce a joint venture in which Boeing will invest $7,500,000 over the next three years in a new Aerospace Data Analytics Laboratory that Carnegie Mellon will establish. The new laboratory is to investigate the use of artificial intelligence and "big data" in improving the design, construction, maintenance, and operation of modern airplanes. Initially, the laboratory will involve more than 20 Carnegie Mellon faculty and student researchers exploring at least six Boeing-directed projects.

1–2 October (overnight)
 Russian aircraft strike targets deep in Islamic State territory for the first time, with two strikes by Sukhoi Su-34 (NATO reporting name "Fullback") jets outside of Raqqa, Syria, hitting a training camp and a headquarters.

2 October
 Aviastar Flight 7503, a de Havilland Canada DHC-6 Twin Otter (registration PK-BRM) crashes in South Sulawesi, Indonesia, soon after takeoff for a domestic flight from Andi Jemma Airport in Masamba to Sultan Hasanuddin International Airport in Makassar, killing all 10 people on board. Its wreckage is not found until 5 October.
 A United States Air Force C-130J Hercules crashes at Jalalabad Airport in Jalalabad, Afghanistan, killing all 11 people – six U.S. Air Force members and five civilians – on board. The Taliban claims to have shot it down, but the United States armed forces respond that enemy fire is highly unlikely to have caused the crash.
 Strikes by Russian during the day focus on targets in the Syrian governorates of Hama, Homs, and Idlib, which Western analysts says confirms their view that Russia's priority in its air campaign in Syria is the destruction of Free Syrian Army units in northwestern Syria posing the most immediate threat to the Assad regime rather than the Islamic State and Nusra Front as Russia claims. A joint statement sign by the governments of France, Germany, Qatar, Saudi Arabia, Turkey, the United Kingdom, and the United States urges Russia to cease targeting rebel groups in Syria other than the Islamic State and the Nusra Front.
 U.S.-backed rebels in Syria ask the United States to provide them with surface-to-air missiles for defense against Russian airstrikes.
 U.S. Government officials reveal that the United States Government has decided not to oppose the Russian air campaign in Syria directly in the belief that the Russians are immersing themselves in a "quagmire" there, and instead to increase pressure against the Islamic State by, among other things, conducting more airstrikes in Iraq west of the Euphrates River.

3 October
 A predawn airstrike targeting Taliban forces in Kunduz, Afghanistan, mistakenly hits a Doctors Without Borders hospital, killing at least 42 people. A U.S. Air Force Lockheed AC-130 Spectre firing in support of Afghan troops and United States Army Special Forces is implicated in the strike. The United States armed forces have been striking Taliban forces in and around Kunduz since 29 September.
 While Russian Federation Air Force jets are bombing rebel-held villages in Syria's Latakia Governorate, one of them violates Turkey's airspace. Two Turkish Air Force F-16 Fighting Falcons intercept it and escort it back to the Syrian border after it had spent five minutes over Turkey. The Russian government claims that the violation was a mistake due to bad weather, but the North Atlantic Treaty Organization claims that the violation was deliberate.
 The Russian Ministry of Defense announces that Syria-based Russian aircraft have struck 20 targets in Syria over the previous 24 hours; the targets were in Hama and Idlib governorates and outside Raqqa. Russia claims that the strikes targeted the Islamic State and that the four-day-long Russian air campaign in Syria has "significantly decreased the fighting potential" of the Islamic State, causing "panic and desertion in [its] ranks," and that "more than 600 mercenaries have left their positions and are trying to get to Europe," although critics claim that many of the Russian strikes have targeted other Syrian rebels in areas from which the Islamic State was ejected a year-and-a-half earlier. The Syrian Observatory for Human Rights claims that the Russian air campaign has killed 39 civilians.

4 October
 An unidentified MiG-29 (NATO reporting name "Fulcrum") – perhaps Syrian – locks its radar onto Turkish Air Force F-16 Fighting Falcons over the Syrian-Turkish border for more than five minutes.

5 October
 Radars in Syria supporting Syrian missile systems illuminate Turkish Air Force aircraft near the Syrian-Turkish border for more than four minutes. Turkey also claims that an unidentified aircraft locked its radar onto eight Turkish aircraft.
 The North Atlantic Treaty Organization warns Russia to avoid further violations of Turkish airspace.
 The United States Department of Defense announces that the United States armed forces have conducted airstrikes in and around Kunduz, Afghanistan, since 29 September, with two of the strikes within the city itself.
 The pilot of American Airlines Flight 550, an Airbus A320 flying from Phoenix, Arizona, to Boston, Massachusetts, with 152 people on board, dies in mid-flight. The copilot lands the airliner safely at Syracuse, New York.

6 October
 Syrian state television claims that Russian aircraft have struck Palmyra, Syria, and the Syrian Observatory for Human Rights reports that 15 Islamic state members died in the airstrike. Russia reports that its aircraft flew 20 sorties over Syria during the day and struck 12 targets, but denies hitting Palmyra.
 Russia and the United States agree to resume talks on how to prevent conflicts between their military aircraft operating over Syria.
 A day after the death in flight of the pilot of American Airlines Flight 550, the copilot of a United Airlines Flight 1614 – a Boeing 787-8 flying from Houston, Texas, to San Francisco, California – passes out. The plane lands safely at Albuquerque, New Mexico.
 The U.S. Federal Aviation Administration proposes a $1,900,000 fine against SkyPan International, a company based in Chicago, Illinois, for conducting 65 unmanned aerial vehicle (UAV) flights to take videos and photographs – 22 over Chicago and 43 over New York City – between 21 March 2012 and 15 December 2014 between without required air traffic control clearance, equipment, or registration and certification. It is the largest fine ever imposed against a UAV operator for illegal flights, far exceeding the previous record fine of $18,700 levied against Xizmo Media of New York.

7 October

 Russian airstrikes support a Syrian government ground attack against rebel forces defending the Syrian town of Kufranboudah. The attack begins the first major air-and-ground offensive by Syrian forces in cooperation with the Russian Federation Air Force since the Russian air campaign in Syria began on 30 September.
 Members of United States Congress meet with U.S. Federal Aviation Administration officials and experts to discuss ways to avoid collisions with airliners and privately owned unmanned aerial vehicles in the United States. Airline pilot reports of near-collisions with UAVs over the United States have risen to an average of three per day.

8 October
 On China Airlines Flight 8, a Taiwanese woman gives birth to a child during a flight from Taipei, Taiwan, to Los Angeles, California. The flight is diverted to Anchorage, Alaska. The woman returns to Taiwan without her child after being denied entry into the United States.

9 October
 Russia's Ministry of Defense announces that a Russian airstrike on an ammunition depot near Aleppo, Syria, has killed 100 Islamic militants, including two Islamic State field commanders.
 Syrian government forces seize the villages of Atshan and Umm Hartein in central Syria amid intense Russian airstrikes in the region.

10 October

 The Russian Ministry of Defense reports that Syria-based Russian aircraft have flown 64 sorties in the past 24 hours and struck 54 targets in Syria, including rebel command posts in Idlib Governorate and Aleppo Governorate. The Syrian Observatory for Human Right reports that Russian warplanes have struck a headquarters of the Ahrar ash-Sham Islamist-Salafist group in Saraqib, Syria.
 The state-run Syrian Arab News Agency claims that two F-16 Fighting Falcons of the U.S.-led coalition have violated Syrian airspace and bombed civilian infrastructure in Aleppo.
 U.S. and Russian defense officials hold a 90-minute secure videoconference to discuss steps to "promote safe flight operations over Syria."

11 October

 A Royal Air Force Westland Puma HC Mark 2 helicopter severs the mooring cable of an observation balloon and crashes while attempting to land at the headquarters of the North Atlantic Treaty Organization's Resolute Support Mission in Kabul, Afghanistan, killing five people and injuring five others. 
 In response to rocket fire from the Gaza Strip targeting Israeli territory, the Israeli Air Force strikes two Hamas weapons manufacturing facilities in the northern Gaza Strip. The Palestinian Authority reports that the strikes cause the roof of a home to collapse, killing two civilians – the first Palestinian civilian deaths in an Israeli airstrike since 2014 – and injuring several other members of the family, and Israel launches an investigation into the reported civilian deaths.
 A technical problem with Southwest Airlines' online system forces the airline to issue tickets and process passengers manually. By the evening, 450 of Southwest's 3,600 flights scheduled for the day have been delayed. Delays are expected to linger into the following day.

12 October
 Russian aircraft intensify their strikes against rebel forces in central Syria as Syrian government and rebel ground forces contest control of the village of Kfar Nabudeh. The Russian Ministry of Defense reports that Russian Sukhoi Su-24M (NATO reporting name "Fencer"), Sukhoi Su-25SM (NATO reporting name "Frogfoot"), and Sukhoi Su-34 (NATO reporting name "Fullback") aircraft have struck 53 targets – including command centers, ammunition depots, fuel depots, and training camps – in Hama Governorate, Homs Governorate, Idlib Governorate, and Latakia Governorate over the past 24 hours, alleging that they were all Islamic State facilities. Russian aircraft have flown 250 combat sorties in Syria since the Russian air campaign there began on 30 September.
 The first 90 of a planned 300 U.S. military personnel arrive in Cameroon set up a base for unmanned aerial vehicles, which will fly reconnaissance missions targeting Boko Haram in neighboring Nigeria.

13 October
 The U.S. military announces that U.S. and Afghan forces have completed a major, week-long air and ground operation to dismantle al-Qaeda operations in Afghanistan's Shorabak District, with U.S. aircraft conducting 63 strikes during the operation.
 President of Russia Vladimir Putin says that in response to U.S. criticism that the Russian air campaign in Syria is targeting moderate rebels rather than only Islamic State targets as Russia claims, he has asked the United States to provide examples of targets it considers legitimate and for information on targets it does not want Russia to hit, but has received no response.
 The Dutch Safety Board releases its report on the crash of Malaysian Airlines Flight 17 in July 2014, in which it concludes that a Russian-made Buk surface-to-air missile brought the Boeing 777 down, blowing its cockpit off and causing it to break up in mid-air over Ukraine before crashing. It adds that the aircraft should not have flown over the war zone in eastern Ukraine, but also notes that 160 other aircraft did so safely on the day Flight 17 was shot down. Although the report does not attempt to determine who shot the airliner down, the Russian government dismisses it as biased and the result of "political orders" to reach the conclusion that it did.
Their flight is documented by helmet-mounted cameras they are wearing and third-party videos showing the pair soaring and diving around the airliner; the videos will be released in early November 2015.

14 October
 The U.S.-led coalition conducts two airstrikes against Islamic State targets in the Baiji area of Iraq as the Iraqi government announces that its armed forces have seized control of the largest oil refinery in Iraq, located near Baiji, after fighting with the Islamic State over it since June 2014. Aircraft of the U.S.-led coalition have conducted airstrikes in support of the Iraqi forces throughout the battle; at one point, U.S. aircraft dropped supplies to Iraqi forces besieged in the refinery.
 A Royal Navy Fleet Air Arm AgustaWestland Wildcat HMA.2 helicopter of 825 Naval Air Squadron attached to the Type 23 frigate  becomes the first rotary-wing aircraft to land at Saint Helena Airport on Saint Helena.

15 October
 Russian aircraft in Syria strike rebel targets in Aleppo, Hama, and Idlib governorates and in the Damascus suburb of Ghouta. Russian airstrikes against northern Homs Governorate kills 59 civilians – including 33 children – with one strike against a house in Ghantou killing 46 members of one family.
 A U.S. airstrike in northwestern Syria kills Sanafi al-Nasr, the leader of the Khorasan Group. The United States Department of Defense will announce his death on 18 October. He becomes the fifth Khorasan Group leader killed in a U.S. airstrike in the past four months.
 Prosecutors in Scotland announce two new suspects – both Libyan men – on 21 December 1988 in-flight bombing of Pan American Flight 103 over Lockerbie, Scotland.

16 October
 Turkish Air Force jets shoot down an unidentified unmanned aerial vehicle (UAV) near Deliosman in Turkey's Kilis Province after it flies nearly  into Turkish territory from Syria. Both the Syrian government and Russia deny that the UAV is theirs.
 According to the U.S. Federal Aviation Administration, there have been 5,352 incidents of lasers striking aircraft flying over the United States since the beginning of the year, an increase from 3,894 during all of 2014 and 283 in all of 2005.

17 October
 An Airbus A321 operating as US Airways Flight 1939 – commemorating the year of the airline's founding – lands before dawn at the airline's hub in Philadelphia, Pennsylvania, completing a journey begun from Philadelphia on 16 October that stopped at all of US Airways' other hubs – at Charlotte, North Carolina; Phoenix, Arizona; and San Francisco, California. When it lands, the 76-year history of US Airways – which earlier had done business as All American Aviation, Allegheny Airlines, and USAir – comes to an end as it completes its merger with American Airlines. The merger leaves the United States with just four major domestic airlines – American, Delta Air Lines, Southwest Airlines, and United Airlines – down from ten in 2001; the four control 87 percent of the U.S. domestic market.
 An airstrike in Yemen's Taiz Governorate by the Saudi-led coalition mistakenly hits an encampment of pro-government forces allied with the coalition, killing at least 20 and injuring another 20; the pro-government forces had just taken the encampment from Houthi rebels. Other airstrikes in Jawf Governorate kill 13 Houthis.
The formation travels about  before landing.

19 October
 Russian aircraft strike the First Coastal Division rebel group in Syria for the third time since the Russian air campaign began on 30 September, hitting its headquarters in Jabal Akrad. According to the First Coastal Division, the strike kills five of its members, including its chief of staff, Basil Zamo, as well as 15 civilians. 
 The U.S. Federal Aviation Administration (FAA) announces that it will begin to require the registration of privately owned recreational unmanned aerial vehicles (UAVs) with the United States Department of Transportation. United States Secretary of Transportation Anthony Foxx announces that the FAA and Department of Transportation will set up a task force of U.S. government officials and industry representatives to make recommendations on a registion system by 20 November, with the United States Government hoping to have the system in place and functioning by 25 December. American hobbyists are projected to purchase 700,000 UAVs during 2015, up 63 percent from 2014.

20 October
 The U.S. Department of Defense announces that the United States and Russia have signed an aviation safety agreement to keep their aircraft operating over Syria far enough apart to avoid hostile interactions and to ensure that they can communicate with one another if they approach one another too closely. Russian and U.S. aircraft come within  of one another over Syria. The agreement makes no provision for cooperation between the U.S. and Russia in targeting or other aspects of their air campaigns in Syria.
 Lockheed Martin reports that robust sales of its F-35 Lightning II fighter have boosted its third-quarter financial results.

21 October
 Airstrikes by the Saudi-led coalition targeting Houthi rebels combined with indiscriminate shelling by artillery kill at least 20 people and wound 140 in Taiz, Yemen.

22 October
 Residents of Yemen's Hajjah Governorate report that an airstrike by the Saudi-led coalition against a small island in the Red Sea near the Midi District kills 10 fishermen.

23 October
 Talks in Brussels, Belgium, between Russia and Ukraine to avert a ban of each other's airliners from their airports scheduled to take effect on 25 October end unsuccessfully, setting the stage for a halt to direct air travel between the two countries.

25 October
 Ukraine bans Russian airliners from its airports, and Russia retaliates by banning Ukrainian airliners from its airports. The ban effectively ends direct air travel between the two countries, adversely affecting an estimated 700,000 travelers annually.
 The bankrupt Russian airline Transaero goes out of business.

27 October
 United States Navy surveillance aircraft accompany the U.S. Navy guided-missile destroyer  as she steams within 12 nautical miles of Subi Reef in the South China Sea to challenge China's claim to waters around an artificial island it has built on Subi Reef as its territorial waters. A guided-missile destroyer and a patrol boat of the People's Liberation Army Navy shadow Lassen, and China claims that the People's Liberation Army Navy Air Force also reacts, but Lassen concludes her patrol without incident.
 After dark, an antiaircraft gun shoots down a Libyan helicopter carrying 23 people, including two senior commanders of the Libya Dawn group. It crashes in the Mediterranean Sea just off Al Maya, Libya. Rescuers recover the bodies of 14 of the helicopter's occupants and find no survivors.
 The U.S. Department of Defense announces that it has awarded the contract for the U.S. Air Force's next-generation Long-Range Strike Bomber to Northrop Grumman, which beats out a joint Boeing-Lockheed Martin proposal to build the aircraft. The contract value is expected to exceed $55,000,000,000 over the life of the program, making it the largest military aircraft contract since Lockheed Martin won the Joint Strike Fighter contract in 2001.

28 October
 A  unmanned United States Army aerostat making up part of the Joint Land-Attack Cruise Missile Defense Elevated Netted Sensor System (JLENS) breaks loose from its tether at Aberdeen, Maryland, and drifts over Pennsylvania, shadowed by two U.S. Air Force F-16 Fighting Falcon fighters. The following day, Pennsylvania State Police troopers fire about 100 shotgun blasts at the aerostat to deflate it.

29 October
 The left engine of Dynamic Airways Flight 405, a Boeing 767-200ER with 101 people aboard bound for Caracas, Venezuela, leaks fuel and bursts into flames as the aircraft taxis for takeoff at Fort Lauderdale–Hollywood International Airport in Broward County, Florida. The airliner's passengers and crew evacuate via evacuation slides in six minutes; 17 of them are injured. The airport is closed for about two-and-a-half hours, resulting in the cancellation of 43 flights and delays to more than 200 others.

30 October
 United States Army General John F. Campbell, commander of the Resolute Support Mission and of United States Forces-Afghanistan, reports that a multi-day operation announced on 11 October involving Afghan troops, 200 U.S. Special Forces troops, and 63 American airstrikes has destroyed an al-Qaeda in the Indian Subcontinent training camp in the Shorabak District of Afghanistan's Kandahar Province covering  – probably the largest al-Qaeda training camp found during the war in Afghanistan – and another camp covering , killing about 160 al-Qaeda members.

31 October
 Metrojet Flight 9268, an Airbus 321-231 operated by the Russian airline Kogalymavia bound for Saint Petersburg, Russia, breaks apart in midair near its cruising altitude of  23 minutes after takeoff from Sharm el-Sheikh International Airport in Sharm el-Sheikh, Egypt, and crashes in the central Sinai Peninsula, killing all 224 people on board. The Islamic State claims to have brought the plane down, but does not describe how, and experts claim that the Islamic State has no weapons capable of hitting the airliner at the altitude at which it was flying when the incident occurred; after the crash, Air France-KLM, Emirates, and Lufthansa nonetheless announce that their airliners will avoid flying over the Sinai Peninsula.
 The Syrian Observatory for Human Rights reports that Russian airstrikes in Syrian have killed up to 27 civilians since they began on 30 September.

November
1 November
 Air Arabia, Emirates, flydubai, Gulf Air, Jazeera Airways, and Qatar Airways announce that they will reroute their aircraft to avoid flying over the Sinai Peninsula in the wake of 31 October crash of Metrojet Flight 9268. British Airways and Etihad Airways say that they will continue to fly over the Sinai.

2 November
Russian Federation Air Force Sukhoi Su-25 (NATO reporting name "Frogfoot") aircraft bomb Islamic State positions on the outskirts of Palmyra, Syria, destroying a fortification, an underground bunker, and anti-aircraft artillery.
 Ronald Reagan Washington National Airport in Arlington, Virginia, begins a policy of closing its terminal nightly between 11:30 p.m. and 4:30 a.m. Eastern Time. The change is intended to prevent overnight stays in the terminal by homeless people. Previously, the terminal had been open 24 hours a day for many years.

3 November
 Shaheen Air Flight 142, a Boeing 737-4H6 carrying 119 people on a flight from Karachi, skids off the runway while landing at Allama Iqbal International Airport in Lahore, Pakistan, and crashes, injuring 10 of those on board. On 13 November, the Government of Pakistan will charge the pilot with flying while unlawfully fatigued and intoxicated.

4 November
 Volcanic ash from an eruption of Mount Rinjani on Lombok in Indonesia forces Ngurah Rai International Airport on Bali to close until 5 November, prompting the cancellation of 59 international and 47 domestic flights. Lombok International Airport in Mataram on Lombok also closes because of the ash.
 The United Kingdom announces a halt to service at Sharm el-Sheikh, Egypt, by British airlines out of concern that someone there may have smuggled a bomb aboard Metrojet Flight 9268 at Sharm el-Sheikh International Airport that destroyed the airliner.
 The Government of Ireland announces that it will advise Irish airlines to avoid Sharm El-Sheikh.
 An overloaded Antonov An-12 cargo aircraft (registration EY-406) operated by Allied Services, Ltd., carrying a crew of six and at least 12 passengers crashes into a farming village on an island in the White Nile shortly after takeoff from Juba International Airport in Juba, South Sudan. The crash kills a combined 37 people aboard the plane and on the ground; two people aboard the plane survive.
 A gunman firing at the street from an apartment window in San Diego, California, under the approach path to San Diego International Airport prompts the U.S. Federal Aviation Administration to halt landings at the airport; the lack of arriving flights also affects departures, although departures continue during the incident. The gunman surrenders after more than five hours, by which time 30 arriving and departing flights have been cancelled and 30 other flights have been diverted to other airports.

5 November
 President of France François Hollande announces that the French Navy aircraft carrier Charles de Gaulle will deploy to the Persian Gulf to assist in the air campaign against the Islamic State in Iraq and Syria. He does not specify when the ship, in port at Toulon at the time, will deploy. Charles de Gaulle previously had deployed to the Persian Gulf from February to April.
 The Scottish Criminal Review Commission rejects an application for a posthumous appeal of the conviction of Abdel Baset al-Megrahi for the mid-air bombing of Pan Am Flight 103 in December 1988 submitted by a group of relatives of victims who believe that he was unfairly convicted of the crime.
 Prime Minister David Cameron of the United Kingdom says that "more likely than not a terrorist bomb" destroyed Metrojet Flight 9268. In the evening, President Barack Obama says that it was "a possibility" that a bomb brought the plane down.

6 November
 President of Russia Vladimir Putin halts all Russian airline flights between Russia and Egypt and orders the Russian government to take steps to ensure that the estimated 45,000 Russians vacationing in Russia are returned safely to Russia. More than 25 flights a day had traveled between Russia and Egypt prior to the flight ban.
 Working with British Airways, EasyJet, Monarch Airlines, Thomas Cook Airlines, and Thomson Airways, British authorities begin the evacuation of approximately 20,000 British citizens stranded in Sharm el-Sheikh, controversially requiring them to leave all checked luggage – about 120 tons of it – behind to undergo extensive security screening before being shipped to them at home. On the first day, only eight of an originally scheduled 29 flights depart Sharm el-Sheikh International Airport for the United Kingdom, carrying about 4,000 people.
 The U.S. Department of Homeland Security announces that it will enhance the security of airline flights between the Middle East and the United States, using unspecified measures.
 The U.S. Federal Aviation Administration (FAA) informs the U.S. National Transportation Safety Board (NTSB) that it has rejected the NTSB′S April 2014 recommendation that the FAA establish licensing requirements and safety standards for commercial balloon tour operators and make them subject to FAA safety inspections, regulating them in a manner similar to the way it regulates commercial airplane and helicopter tour operators. The FAA argues that such regulation is unnecessary, explaining that "Since the amount of ballooning is so low, the FAA believes the risk to all pilots and participants is also low given that ballooners understand the risks and general hazards associated with this activity." In March 2016, the NTSB will inform the FAA that it finds this response unacceptable and that its recommendation remains open.
 Boeing announces that it has filed a protest over the October United States Department of Defense award of a contract to build the United States Air Force's Long-Range Strike Bomber to Northrop Grumman, claiming there were irregularities in the selection process.

7 November
 Fifty-one Russian aircraft fly about 11,000 Russian tourists home from Sharm El-Sheikh and Hurghada, Egypt, as an airlift of Russian citizens stranded in Egypt begins. They are required to leave their checked baggage behind in Egypt for special screening and later shipment to Russia by cargo aircraft.

8 November
 Venezuelan Minister of Defense General Vladimir Padrino López states on television that a United States Coast Guard intelligence plane – which he identifies as a Bombardier Dash 8 – violated Venezuela's airspace near the Los Monjes Archipelago on 6 November. The United States does not comment on his claim.

9 November
 Russian Deputy Prime Minister Arkady Dvorkovich announces that 25,000 Russians have been airlifted home from Egypt since 7 November, and that he expects it to take about two weeks to fly all remaining Russians in Egypt home. The Russian Ministry of Emergency Situations reports that during the day four Russian cargo planes have transported 130 tons of luggage to Russia that Russian tourists had left behind in Egypt for special security screening.

10 November
 Execuflight Flight EFT1526, a Hawker 800 business jet, crashes into an apartment complex while on approach to land at Akron Fulton International Airport in Akron, Ohio. No one on the ground is injured, but all nine people – two pilots and seven passengers – aboard the plane die.

11 November
 During the evening, lasers strike more than 20 aircraft flying over Ontario, Canada, Puerto Rico, and ten U.S. states – including aircraft flying over Dallas, Texas, Los Angeles, California, and New York City.

12 November
 Aircraft of the U.S.-led coalition – including U.S. and Royal Air Force aircraft – strike Islamic State targets in support of an offensive by Kurdish peshmerga forces to take Sinjar, Syria.
 Three U.S. unmanned aerial vehicles track Mohammed Emwazi – the Islamic State operative known as "Jihadi John" – as he gets into a ground vehicle in Raqqa, Syria, and fire two AGM-114 Hellfire air-to-ground missiles at the vehicle. The next day, the U.S. Department of Defense announces that the strike destroyed the vehicle and that it is "reasonably certain" that Emwazi was killed.
 Vincent Asaro is found not guilty of involvement in the December 1978 robbery of $5 million in cash and $875,000 in jewels newly flown in from West Germany from the Lufthansa cargo handling area at John F. Kennedy International Airport in New York City. The robbery had been dramatized in the 1990 movie Goodfellas.

13 November
 Two United States Air Force F-15 Eagles strike a building containing several people in a compound outside Derna, Libya. The strike is believed to have killed Abu Nabil al-Anbari, the leader of the Islamic State affiliate in Libya. It is the first time that the United States has struck an Islamic State target outside of Iraq and Syria. The United States Department of Defense will confirm his death on 7 December.
 The Russian Ministry of Emergency Situations reports that 480 tons of luggage left behind in Egypt by Russian tourists for additional security screening since the crash of Metrojet Flight 9268 has been flown to Moscow for delivery to its owners.

14 November
 An unmanned aerial vehicle air-to-ground missile strike in the Khogyani District of Afghanistan's Nangahar Province kills 12 Taliban members.
 Russian aircraft have conducted more than 1,600 sorties in support of Syrian Arab Army operations against rebel forces since the Russian air campaign in Syria began on 30 September, striking targets in six of Syria's 14 governorates. The air campaign has helped Syrian Arab Army forces to lift the rebel siege of Kuweires air base and capture two towns southwest of Aleppo, but otherwise has accomplished little, with rebel forces even capturing ground in some areas.

15 November
 Two days after major Islamic State terrorist attacks in Paris which French President François Hollande describes as an "act of war," 12 French Air Force planes including 10 fighter aircraft take off from airfields in Jordan and the United Arab Emirates and drop at least 30 bombs on Islamic State targets in Raqqa, Syria, hitting a command center, a recruitment and training center, an ammunition storage depot, and a training camp. Among the targets is a museum, medical facilities, and the city's sports stadium, which the Islamic State uses as its headquarters and as a prison. The French strikes knock out electrical power in the city of about 200,000 people.

16 November
 The United States makes its first attack against the fleet of trucks the Islamic State uses to smuggle oil to finance itself when six United States Air Force aircraft – two AC-130 Spectres and four A-10 Thunderbolt IIs – based in Turkey attack a truck assembly area near Deir ez-Zor, Syria. The A-10s drop two dozen 500-pound (227-kg) bombs and strafe the trucks with 30-millimeter Gatling guns, while the AC-130s fire both 30-millimeter Gatling guns and 105-millimeter M102 howitzers, combining to destroy 116 of the 295 trucks in the assembly area. To reduce the number of civilian casualties, two U.S. Air Force F-15 Eagles fly over the area about an hour before the strike dropping leaflets warning the truck drivers to abandon their trucks and take cover, followed by strafing runs to reinforce the point. The attack is part of Operation Tidal Wave II, a new campaign to destroy the Islamic State's oil distribution network.
 Russian aircraft support a Syrian Arab Army offensive against rebel forces in Syria's Aleppo Governorate.
 Rosturizm reports that Russian aircraft have evacuated 70,000 Russians from Egypt and flown them back to Russia since the crash of Metrojet Flight 9268 and that 5,000 remain in Egypt, about 3,000 in Hurghada and about 2,000 in Sharm El-Sheikh.
 The deputy director of Russia's Federal Security Service (FSB), Oleg Syromolotov, announces that Russia thwarted a plot by female suicide bombers prior to the 2014 Winter Olympic Games in Sochi to bring explosives on board an airliner in hand cream.
 Prime Minister David Cameron announces that the United Kingdom will double its spending on aviation security.

17 November
 The Government of Japan files lawsuit seeking an injunction to overturn the local government of Okinawa's cancellation of a previously issued approval for land reclamation work for the relocation of a U.S. airbase from U.S. Marine Corps Air Station Futenma in Ginowan, outside Naha, to a less-populated part of the island at Camp Schwab in Nago.
The Government of Russia offers a $50,000,000 reward for information about the attack, and President of Russia Vladimir Putin says that Russia would invoking its right to self-defense under the United Nations Charter and orders the Russian armed forces to intensify their air campaign in Syria where Russian aircraft conduct a "significant number of strikes" in the vicinity of Raqqa during the day.
 Russian Federation Air Force Tupolev Tu-22M (NATO reporting name "Backfire"), Tupolev Tu-95 (NATO reporting name "Bear"), and Tupolev Tu-160 (NATO reporting name "Blackjack") aircraft flying from bases in Russia strike Islamic State targets in Raqqa, Syria. The Tu-22Ms drop bombs, while the Tu-95s and Tu-160s launch 34 land-attack cruise missiles.
 Russian military helicopters fly in personnel to Sadad, Syria, assist the Gozarto Protection Force, an Assyrian Christian militia, in fighting the Islamic State in the town.
 Ten French Air Force aircraft – Mirage 2000 and Dassault Rafale fighters – bomb Islamic State targets – including a command post and a recruitment center – in Raqqa early in the day, and the French Navy aircraft carrier Charles de Gaulle departs Toulon to deploy for operations targeting the Islamic State. The French Minister of Defense, Jean-Yves Le Drian, announces that when Charles de Gaulle arrives on station, France's force of fighter aircraft within range of the Islamic State will rise to 36 aircraft.
 The United States has conducted 8,253 airstrikes against Islamic State targets since U.S.-led coalition began its air campaign against the Islamic State in August 2014, accounting for 95 percent of the coalition's strikes.
 Reuters reports that the Government of Egypt is detaining 17 people in connection with the destruction of Metrojet Flight 9268, including two employees of Sharm el-Sheikh International Airport suspected of helping terrorists plant a bomb on the plane, although Egypt's Ministry of the Interior and Ministry of Civil Aviation deny it.

18 November
 Since the U.S.-led coalition began its air campaign against the Islamic State in August 2014, its aircraft have dropped an average of 2,228 bombs per month at an average cost of $11,100,000 per day. The strikes have killed an estimated 20,000 Islamic State personnel.
 A strike over pay and labor union rights by baggage handlers and other airport employees begins at seven major airline hubs in the United States. The strike – at John F. Kennedy International Airport and LaGuardia Airport in New York City, Logan International Airport in Boston, Massachusetts, O'Hare International Airport in Chicago, Illinois, Fort Lauderdale–Hollywood International Airport in Broward County, Florida, Newark Liberty International Airport in Newark, New Jersey, and Philadelphia International Airport in Philadelphia, Pennsylvania – is expected to last until at least 19 November.

19 November
 The United States has conducted more than 3,768 airstrikes in Iraq, with the tempo of strikes increasing.

21 November
 A Eurocopter AS350 Écureuil sightseeing helicopter operated by Alpine Adventures crashes on Fox Glacier on the South Island of New Zealand, killing all seven people on board.

23 November
 The search for Malaysian Airlines Flight 370, a Boeing 777 missing since March 2014, shifts to a remote part of the Indian Ocean southwest of Australia where an experienced British Boeing 777 captain, Simon Hardy, estimates that it may have made a controlled water landing and sunk largely intact. The Australian Transport Safety Bureau reports that the shift is occurring because of improved Southern Hemisphere spring weather in a  priority search area rather than because of Hardy's analysis.
 Dozens of Russian airstrikes support an offensive by Syrian government troops that captures the Syrian towns of Mahin and Hawwarin in western Homs Governorate from Islamic State forces.
 Russian missile strikes against Islamic State targets in Syria disrupt civilian air traffic in the area, with airports in northern Iraq closed for a second straight day and aircraft arriving at or departing from Beirut–Rafic Hariri International Airport in Beirut, Lebanon, routed around a Russian-declared exclusion zone over the northeastern Mediterranean Sea.
The landing is considered a major step forward in the development of a fully reusable rocket booster that will allow cheap space travel.

24 November
It is the first time that an aircraft of a NATO member country has shot down an aircraft of the Soviet Union or Russia since a dogfight between United States Navy and Soviet aircraft in November 1952 during the Korean War. Russia denies that the Su-24 was flying in Turkish airspace and claims that antiaircraft artillery shot it down while it was flying over Syria. Both crew members eject from the Su-24; Russia claims that Syrian rebels fire at the pilot in his parachute while he drifts to earth and kill him, while the navigator escapes. The plane itself crashes in Syria's Turkmen Bayırbucak region, where two Russian helicopters are sent to search for its two-man crew. One of them, a Mil Mi-8 (NATO reporting name "Hip") is forced to crash-land in neutral territory after coming under heavy ground fire from Syrian rebels, who hit it with an anti-tank guided missile, and one man on board – a naval infantryman – is killed; the rest of its crew is rescued.
 Since its intervention in Syria began on 30 September, Russia has conducted over 4,000 airstrikes in Syria, where it has based at least 32 fixed-wing aircraft – including 12 Sukhoi Su-24 (NATO reporting name "Fencer"), 12 Sukhoi Su-25 (NATO reporting name "Frogfoot") and four Sukhoi Su-34 (NATO reporting name "Fullback") strike aircraft and four Sukhoi Su-30 (NATO reporting name "Flanker-C") fighters – and 16 helicopters at Khmeimim Air Base near Latakia.

25 November
 In the aftermath of Turkey shooting down one of its Syria-based Su-24s the previous day, Russia says that it will take new measures to protect its aircraft operating in Syria, including the deployment of S-400 (NATO reporting name "SA-21 Growler") surface-to-air missile systems to Khmeimim Air Base in Syria. The S-400s, with a range of  will be only  from the Turkish border.
 After Russia cuts off all deliveries of natural gas to Ukraine, Ukraine retaliates by banning Russian airliners from flying in its airspace. The Ukrainian ban expands upon a 25 October Ukrainian prohibition of Russian airliners landing at Ukrainian airports.
 The commander of the Resolute Support Mission in Afghanistan, General John F. Campbell, announces that a mistaken U.S. Air Force AC-130 Spectre strike against a Doctors Without Borders hospital in Kunduz on 3 October resulted from errors made by the aircrew and United States Army Special Forces personnel on the ground, who mistook the hospital for a Taliban-held building several hundred yards (meters) away due to fatigue and a high operating tempo. He also announces that several American military personnel have been suspended over the incident and may face additional disciplinary measures.

27 November
 Russian aircraft strike a flour mill and a bakery in Saraqib, Syria, that serve 50,000 people in Syria's Idlib Governorate

28 November
 President of Russia Vladimir Putin signs sweeping economic sanctions against Turkey into law in retaliation for Turkey shooting down a Russian Federation Air Force Sukhoi Su-24 (NATO reporting name "Fencer") on 24 November. Included in the sanctions is a ban on air charter flights from Russia to Turkey.

29 November
 Strikes by jet aircraft, presumed to be Russian, on rebel-held Ariha, Syria, hit a busy market, killing at least 18 people and injuring dozens; one report puts the death toll at 40 and the number of injured at over 70. It is one of the deadliest airstrikes since the Russian air campaign in Syria began on 30 September.
 Israel's Minister of Defense, Moshe Ya'alon, announces that a Syria-based Russian military jet had recently mistakenly violated Israeli airspace, flying about  into Israel, but the Israel Defense Force had not shot it down and it had returned to Syrian airspace after being contacted by Israeli forces.
 The last Boeing C-17 Globemaster III, intended for delivery to the United Arab Emirates Air Force in 2017, takes off from the Boeing assembly plant at Long Beach, California, conducting a flyover of the facility before departing. Boeing, which delivered the U.S. Air Force's last C-17 in September 2013, plans to close the Long Beach plant by the end of 2015 – except for small sections left open for one to two more years to provide engineering support for C-17s – because of insufficient foreign orders for the C-17 to justify keeping the assembly line open.

30 November
 A U.S. Air Force-funded University of Maryland School of Medicine study published in the Journal of Neurotrauma finds that rapid air evacuation of wounded personnel suffering from traumatic brain injury – previously assumed to have increased their chances of survival and recovery – leads to more inflammation of the brain and could cause more damage. Reduced air pressure in an airborne aircraft's interior is a major reason for the increased inflammation, as is overuse of 100 percent supplemental oxygen in such a lower-pressure environment.

December 
 During the month, the United Nations Office for the Coordination of Humanitarian Affairs releases a report that finds that Russian airstrikes against border crossings and highways in Syria used to deliver humanitarian supplies from Turkey – including one instance in which Russian aircraft struck a hub at the Bab al-Salameh border crossing where truck drivers collect humanitarian supplies for Syria three times in five days – have forced humanitarian agencies to reduce or halt aid to Syrian civilians living in areas of conflict between the Government of Syria and rebel forces. The report also states that Russian aircraft have struck 20 medical facilities, 10 bakeries, a grain silo, and a water treatment plant in Syria since the Russian intervention there began on 30 September.

2 December
 A U.S. airstrike in Somalia kills senior Al-Shabaab leader Abdirahman Sandhere, also known as "Ukash." The United States Department of Defense will confirm his death on 7 December.
 After more than 10 hours of debate, the British Parliament votes in favor of the United Kingdom beginning an air campaign against the Islamic State in Syria. British aircraft previously had only attacked Islamic State targets in Iraq in a campaign they had begun just over a year earlier.

4 December
 The German Bundestag votes to expand Germany's role in combat against the Islamic State, approving among other things the basing of seven Luftwaffe planes – six Panavia Tornado reconnaissance aircraft and a tanker aircraft – at Incirlik Air Base in Turkey to provide reconnaissance and refueling support to other aircraft of the U.S.-led coalition. Germany's constitution prohibits German aircraft from participating directly in airstrikes.

6 December
 Airstrikes against Islamic State positions on the northern and eastern outskirts of Raqqa, Syria, kill at least 15 and perhaps as many as 32 Islamic State personnel and wound another 25 to 40. The Syrian Observatory for Human Rights claims that the attacking aircraft were from the U.S.-led coalition, while the Islamic State claims they were Russian planes.

6–7 December (overnight)
 Four jet aircraft fire nine rockets at Syrian Arab Army positions in Ayyash in Syria's Deir ez-Zor Governorate, destroying three armored vehicles, four other military vehicles, two heavy machine guns, and an arms depot and killing three Syrian soldiers and wounding 13. On 7 December, the Syrian Ministry of Foreign Affairs blames the attack on the U.S.-led coalition, the first time it has claimed that the coalition has attacked its forces since the coalition's air campaign in Syria began 14 months earlier. A U.S. military spokesman replies the same day that no coalition airstrikes took place in the area, and that Russian aircraft struck the Syrian troops.
 Aircraft of the U.S.-led coalition strike Islamic State oil wells in Syria's Deir ez-Zor Governorate, at least  from the site of the strike on Syrian troops at Ayyash.

7 December
 Unidentified aircraft strike the Sukkari neighborhood of rebel-held Aleppo, Syria, killing eight civilians. Rebel activists claim the aircraft were either Syrian or Russian.
 A U.S. airstrike in Raqqa, Syria, kills Islamic State external operations leader Rawand Dilsher Taher. The U.S. Department of Defense will announce the strike on 29 December.
 A U.S. airstrike in Hawija, Iraq, kills Khalil Ahmad Ali al-Wais, also known as Abu Wadhah, the Islamic State emir in Iraq's Kirkuk Governorate. The U.S. Department of Defense will announce the strike on 29 December.

8 December
 A U.S. airstrike in Kirkuk, Iraq, kills Islamic State cell facilitator Abu Anas. The U.S. Department of Defense will announce the strike on 29 December.
 Russian Federation Air Force Tupolev Tu-22M bombers (NATO reporting name "Backfire") flying from bases in Russia take part in cruise missile strikes against targets in Syria that also include cruise missiles fired by Russian Navy surface ships in the Caspian Sea and a Russian submarine in the Mediterranean Sea. Russian Minister of Defense Sergei Shoigu announces that Tu-22M bombers have flown 60 sorties against targets in Syria over the past three days.
 Airstrikes by the Saudi-led coalition target rebel forces during fighting over a military base in Mocha, Yemen. The airstrikes and ground fighting kill a combined 35 people.
 A medivac Bell 407 helicopter crashes near Fresno, California, killing all four occupants.

9 December
 A U.S. airstrike in Mosul, Iraq, kills Yunish Khalash, also known as Abu Jawdat, the Islamic State's deputy financial amir in Mosul. The U.S. Department of Defense will announce the strike on 29 December.
 A U.S. airstrike in Hawija, Iraq, kills Mithaq Najim, the Islamic State's deputy emir in Iraq's Kirkuk Governorate. The U.S. Department of Defense will announce the strike on 29 December.
 Devastating Syrian government airstrikes against rebels hit Hamouria, Syria, reportedly killing 11 civilians.

10 December
 A U.S. airstrike near Raqqa, Syria, kills Siful Haque Sujan, an Islamic State external operations planner. The U.S. Department of Defense will announce the strike on 29 December.

11 December
 Firefighters respond within minutes when an Air China Boeing 737-800 taxiing at Fuzhou Changle International Airport in Fuzhou, China, reports sparks coming from one of its engines, but mistakenly douse a Fuzhou Airlines Boeing 737-800 instead when they see exhaust fumes emerging from its engines. The incident delays 30 flights at the airport; the Fuzhou Airlines plane the firefighters foamed is delayed 10 hours while undergoing a post-incident safety check.

12 December
 A U.S. airstrike near Tal Afar, Iraq, kills Akram Muhammad Sa’ad Faris, also known as Akram Aabu, an Islamic State commander and executioner. The U.S. Department of Defense will announce the strike on 29 December.

13 December
 Rebel forces in Eastern Ghouta, Syria, fire more than 40 mortar rounds into Damascus, killing three people and wounding 33, and Syrian government forces respond with airstrikes against Douma and Saqba, both part of Eastern Ghouta, which kill least 45 – and perhaps as many as 49 – people.

14 December
 Syrian government attack helicopters strike Darayya, Syria.
 The head of the investigation of the crash of Metrojet Flight 9268 run by Egypt's Ministry of Civil Aviation announces that Egypt has found no evidence of any "illegal or terrorist act." The announcement conflicts with the views of Russia, the United Kingdom, and the United States, all of which have expressed the belief that a bomb destroyed the airliner.
 The U.S. Federal Aviation Administration (FAA) announces new regulations requiring that all unmanned aerial vehicles in the United States weighing between  be registered with the FAA, with registration to begin on 21 December. The Consumer Electronics Association estimates that Christmas gifts in 2015 in the United States will include 700,000 new UAVs.

16 December
 After rebel forces violate a seven-day ceasefire in Yemen on its first day, the Saudi-led coalition responds with airstrikes against rebels in Taiz and in the Sirwah District of the Ma'rib Governorate.
The United States and Cuba agree to allow U.S. airlines to provide scheduled service to Cuba for the first time since the early 1960s, with flights likely to begin sometime between March and June 2016. The agreement also allows the Cuban government airline Cubana de Aviación to provide scheduled service to the United States, although outstanding judgments against Cuba in U.S. courts make Cubana's airliners subject to seizure, meaning that Cubana will have to lease aircraft or share routes to avoid the risk of its aircraft being seized while on the ground in the United States.

16–17 December
 After the Islamic State launches an offensive against Iraqi Kurdish peshmerga forces in Iraq north and east of Mosul, British, Canadian, French, and U.S. aircraft of the U.S.-led coalition conduct a 17-hour aerial bombardment of the attackers, killing at least 180 Islamic State personnel; peshmerga forces kill additional Islamic State personnel in ground combat. Immediately prior to the beginning of the offensive, an Islamic State unmanned aerial vehicle flies over peshmerga positions, apparently passing targeting information to Islamic State ground forces.

18 December
 With Iraqi Air Force aircraft unable to support an Iraqi Army offensive against the Islamic State in Iraq south of Fallujah due to weather conditions, the Iraqi armed forces ask the U.S.-led coalition to provide the air support. U.S. aircraft conduct three strikes; two of them hit Islamic State forces, destroying two ground vehicles and four fighting positions. Due to a lack of communication between Iraqi and U.S. forces, however, the third strike hits an area recently overrun by Iraqi forces, killing 10 Iraqi soldiers. It is the first reported "friendly fire" incident in Iraq since the U.S.-led coalition began its air campaign against the Islamic State.

19 December
China claims that 10 December flight of a United States Air Force B-52H Stratofortress over a Chinese-claimed artificial island in the South China Sea was a "serious military provocation" during which Chinese military personnel on the island went on high alert and issued warnings to the plane demanding that it leave the area. A United States Department of Defense spokesman says that the B-52H was not on a "freedom of navigation" mission and may merely have strayed off course.
 An airstrike on the outskirts of Damascus, Syria, kills the Lebanese militant Samir Kuntar. Hezbollah blames the airstrike on Israel, which neither confirms nor denies its involvement.

20 December
 Russian aircraft conduct nine strikes against rebel-held Idlib, Syria, reportedly hitting a court house and an intelligence building and killing at least 36 people, with one report of 43 dead.
 Human Rights Watch reports that Syrian government and Russian aircraft have been using cluster munitions that have killed dozens of civilians over the past several weeks.

21 December
 Minutes after a SpaceX Falcon 9 rocket launches a payload of 11 satellites from Cape Canaveral Air Force Station, Florida, into Earth orbit for Orbcomm, the rocket's first stage turns back toward Earth and makes a soft landing at its launching pad at SpaceX Landing Zone 1 at the Air Force station, using its engine thrust to slow itself for the landing. It is the first time in history that a rocket has launched a payload into orbit and then returned safely to the Earth, a capability that promises to lower the cost of space flight dramatically.
 Mandatory registration with the U.S. Federal Aviation Administration of privately owned unmanned aerial vehicles weighing between  begins in the United States. UAVs purchased prior to 21 December must be registered by 19 February 2016, and those purchased on or after 21 December must be registered before their first flight.

22 December
 The U.S. Department of Defense reports that 56 percent of all aircraft of the U.S.-led coalition operating against Islamic State targets in Iraq and Syria are returning from strike missions without having used their weapons, either because of weather or concerns over the possibility of unwarranted civilian casualties. The figure is a reduction from the 75 percent of aircraft reported returning with their weapons a few months earlier, a change officials attribute to better intelligence on the existence and location of targets.
 The U.S. Federal Aviation Administration announces that Boeing has agreed to pay a $12 million fine to the United States Government and make changes in how it builds commercial aircraft to settle complaints that it had used substandard safety and quality processes, with up to $24 million in additional fines possible if Boeing does not adhere to the agreement through 2020. The agreement settles two enforcement cases and 11 other issues the FAA has brought to Boeing's attention in recent years involving such matters as missing a 2012 deadline to provide airlines with information on how to install devices on Boeing 747s and Boeing 757s to prevent fuel tank explosions and a 2013 complaint that Boeing had used improper fasteners on Boeing 777s and had not taken action to correct the problem over the following two years. It is the second-highest fine ever paid to in an FAA enforcement case and the highest by an aircraft manufacturer.

23 December
 A mortar attack against Sabiha Gökçen International Airport in Istanbul, Turkey, damages five aircraft, kills a woman who worked as a cleaner at the airport, and injures another cleaner. On 26 December, the Kurdistan Freedom Falcons will claim responsibility for the attack.
 After starting a Black Lives Matter rally at the Mall of America in Bloomington, Minnesota, as a decoy, some of the group's protestors take a light rail train to Minneapolis–Saint Paul International Airport, where they gather inside one of its two terminals, forcing two security checkpoints to close for about 45 minutes and blocking access to the terminal. They also obstruct roads leading to the airport, snarling ground traffic. No flights are cancelled, but a number of them are delayed.
 A sleeping bus driver crashed a Jet Airways bus into a parked Kingfisher Air plane at Calcutta Airport. The plane was later written off.

24 December
 Syrian government jets and attack helicopters strike Hamouriyeh, Syria – a rebel-held suburb of Damascus – killing at least 20 people. One report places the death toll at 23, with dozens more injured.
 A U.S. airstrike in Syria kills terrorist leader Charaffe al Mouadan, who had ties to terrorists involved on 13 November 2015 attacks in Paris. The U.S. Department of Defense will announce the strike on 29 December.

25 December
 The local government of Okinawa files suit against the central government of Japan to block the relocation of U.S. Marine Corps Air Station Futenma in Ginowan, outside Naha, to Camp Schwab in Nago.
 Thirteen airstrikes hit Syrian rebel targets in eastern Damascus. One of them, a Russian airstrike, kills several Syrian rebel officials including senior rebel commander Zahran Allouch as they meet to resolve a dispute between factions of the rebel Jaysh al-Islam coalition.

26 December
 A U.S. airstrike in Mosul, Iraq, kills Abdel Kader Hakim, an Islamic State external operations leader. The U.S. Department of Defense will announce the strike on 29 December.

27 December
 A U.S. airstrike near Mosul, Iraq, kills Tashin al-Haali, an Islamic State external operations facilitator. The U.S. Department of Defense will announce the strike on 29 December.
 The Bild am Sonntag newspaper quotes Germany's Federal Minister of Transport and Digital Infrastructure, Alexander Dobrindt, as saying that pilots in Europe should face unannounced drug, alcohol, and medicine testing, adding that the United States and Australia already conduct such tests.

29 December
 A stolen Civil Air Patrol Cessna 172 Skyhawk crashes into an unoccupied commercial building in downtown Anchorage, Alaska, clipping another building where the pilot's wife works before crashing. On 1 January 2016, the pilot's family will claim he committed suicide in the crash and did not intend to harm his wife or anyone else.

30 December
 Supported by the heaviest Russian aerial bombardment in southern Syria since the Russian air campaign in Syria began on 30 September, Syrian Arab Army troops fight their way into Sheikh Maksin against rebel forces. Rebels report at least 100 air raids targeting them during the previous two days.
 A South African teenager finds a piece of debris on a beach in Mozambique and takes it home to South Africa. In March 2016, his family will turn the debris in to South African aviation officiaLs, who plan to examine it to see if it is from Malaysian Airlines Flight 370, a Boeing 777 missing since 8 March 2014.

31 December
 China confirms that it is constructing a second aircraft carrier for its People's Liberation Army Navy. The Chinese Ministry of National Defense announces that the new carrier will displace 50,000 tons, have a ski jump ramp, and operate Shenyang J-15 fighter aircraft. It will be the first aircraft carrier constructed in China.
 According to the U.S. Federal Aviation Administration, there were 764 reports of unmanned aerial vehicles (UAVs, or "drones") sighted near airplanes in the United States in 2015. An estimated 700,000 UAVs were sold in the United States during the year, raising concerns about the threat they pose to other aircraft when operated improperly.
 Cuba has seen dramatic growth in commercial airline flights during 2015, with 18 percent more than in 2014 in aviation#2014. Nearly 160,000 U.S. leisure travelers have flown to Cuba during 2015, as have hundreds of thousands of Cuban-Americans visiting family in Cuba, following a thaw in political relations between the United States and Cuba that began in December 2014. Although U.S. law still prohibits tourist travel to Cuba, it permits a dozen other categories of travel, including family visits, official business, journalist visits, professional meetings and educational and religious activities, and the United States Government has relaxed oversight of travel to the point that U.S. travelers are allowed to design their own "people-to-people" cultural exchanges in Cuba that in essence permit leisure travel under the guise of a cultural exchange.

First flights

February
3 February - Embraer KC-390 - PT-ZNF
6 February - Dassault Falcon 8X - F-WWQA
6 February - Enstrom TH180 - N180TH
27 February - Bombardier CS300 - C-FFDK

March
7 March - Kamov Ka-52K

April
9 April - Flight Design C4 - D-EZFD

May
7 May - Antonov An-178 - UR-EXP
11 May Pilatus PC-24 - HB-VXA
18 May Gulfstream G500 - N500GA
22 May Sikorsky S-97 Raider - N971SK

June
13 June - Airbus Helicopters H160 - F-WWOG

July
1 July - Bell 525 Relentless - N525TA

September
 2 September – Windward Performance Perlan II
 14 September - Aero L-39NG
 25 September – Boeing KC-46 Pegasus

October
5 October - KAI KT-100 - 16-001
27 October - Sikorsky CH-53K King Stallion

November
11 November - Mitsubishi Regional Jet

December
19 December - Epic E1000 - N331FT
25 December - KB SAT SR-10

Entered service
 15 January – Airbus A350 with Qatar Airways
 31 July – F-35B Lighting II, United States Marine Corps version of the Lockheed Martin F-35 Lightning II Joint Strike Fighter, with Marine Fighter Attack Squadron 121 (VMFA-121); first version of the F-35 to enter service

Retirements

1 August – Boeing Vertol CH-46 Sea Knight by the United States Marine Corps; the last one to fly is a CH-46E model
29 September – Boeing Vertol HH-46 Sea Knight by the United States Navy; the last one to fly is an HH-46E model

References

 
Aviation by year